= Social Path / Super Bowl (Japanese Ver.) =

- Regular edition cover

EP by Stray Kids
- Released: September 6, 2023
- Studio: JYPE (Seoul)
- Length: 16:02
- Language: English; Japanese
- Label: Epic Japan
- Producer: 3Racha; Versachoi; Zack Djurich

Stray Kids chronology
5-Star (2023)	Social Path / Super Bowl (Japanese Ver.) (2023)	Rock-Star (2023)

Singles from Social Path / Super Bowl (Japanese Ver.)
- 1. "Super Bowl (Japanese ver.)" Released: August 10, 2023; 2. "Social Path" Released: August 30, 2023

Social Path / Super Bowl (Japanese Ver.) (Note: Also titled Social Path (Feat. Lisa) / Super Bowl (Japanese Ver.)) is the third Japanese-language extended play (12th overall) by South Korean boy band Stray Kids. It was released on September 6, 2023, through Epic Records Japan. It has been marketed as the group's "Japan first EP", despite having two previous (All In (2020), and Circus (2022)), which were officially classified as "mini-albums".

Social Path / Super Bowl (Japanese Ver.) features a guest appearance from Japanese singer-songwriter Lisa. Commercially, the EP reached number one on the Oricon Albums Chart and Billboard Japan Hot Albums for two consecutive weeks, and was certified million by Recording Industry Association of Japan (RIAJ). It won Best 5 Singles at the 38th Japan Gold Disc Award.

== Background and release ==
On June 26, 2023, the group announced their first Japanese-language extended play, set to be released on September 6. Pre-orders began on the same day, coming in four editions–limited A and B, regular, and eight different-cover fanclub editions. On July 27, Stray Kids revealed the EP title Social Path (Feat. Lisa) / Super Bowl (Japanese Ver.), alongside the track listing, confirmed double lead single "Social Path", featuring Japanese singer-songwriter Lisa, and the Japanese version of "Super Bowl", originally from the group's third studio album 5-Star. The cover artworks for all editions were unveiled on July 31. The Japanese version of "Super Bowl" was released on August 10, while "Social Path" came on the 30th, both alongside its accompanying music video.

== Music and lyrics ==
The first track "Social Path", featuring Lisa, is a rock number, expressing both artists' experiences in a music career and strong belief and determination. "Super Bowl" compares Stray Kids' music to cooking. It is driven by a techno sound, and includes whispering in a manner similar to ASMR. "Butterflies" is a combination of bossa nova, hip hop, and a piano melody.

== Promotion ==
In support of Social Path / Super Bowl (Japanese Ver.), Stray Kids embarked on their 5-Star Dome Tour in Japan and South Korea. It was started on August 16 at PayPay Dome, Fukuoka, and set to conclude on October 29 at Tokyo Dome, Tokyo. At the tour, the group gave the debut performances of both "Super Bowl" and "Social Path". The group appeared on the cover and gave an interview for Harper's Bazaar Japan. and 25ans in July. To commemorate the release, the group held a live event to introduce the EP. Stray Kids, including Lisa, appeared on the television special Venue 101 Presents Stray Kids 5-Star Live on September 23, to perform "Social Path", "S-Class", "Case 143" (Japanese version), "Back Door", and "Thunderous".

== Commercial performance ==
On the flying get day, September 5, Social Path / Super Bowl (Japanese Ver.) sold 556,425 copies, according to SoundScan Japan, and 333,433 copies for Oricon. The EP debuted at number one on the Oricon Albums Chart and the Combined Albums Chart, the second number one album in Japan after The Sound (2023). With 506,000 copies, the EP became the group's biggest sales in first week, surpassing 378,000 copies of the previous release. It topped the both charts for two consecutive weeks with 72,000 copies on its second week, total 578,000 copies.

For Billboard Japan, Social Path / Super Bowl (Japanese Ver.) entered the Hot Albums chart at number one, earning 737,965 CD copies and 749 digital sales. It continually peaked at number one in the second week, selling 198,130 copies. The EP became the third best-selling album on the 2023 year-end Billboard Japan Hot Albums with 1,089,952 copies. On September 29, Sony Music Labels reported that the album surpasses one million shipments, which later received million certification from Recording Industry Association of Japan (RIAJ) on October 10, the fastest Korean boy group to reach million shipments since their debut in Japan.

== Accolades ==
List of awards and nominations received by Social Path / Super Bowl (Japanese Ver.)
Ceremony	Year	Category	Result	Ref.
Japan Gold Disc Award	2024	Best 5 Singles	Won	

== Track listing ==
Social Path / Super Bowl (Japanese Ver.) track listing
No.	Title	Lyrics	Music	Arrangement	Length
1.	"Social Path" (featuring Lisa)	Bang Chan (3Racha); Changbin (3Racha); Han (3Racha); Yohei	Bang Chan; Changbin; Han; Versachoi	Versachoi	3:19
2.	"Super Bowl" (Japanese version)	Bang Chan; Changbin; Han; Felix; KM-Markit	Bang Chan; Changbin; Han; Zack Djurich	Djurich; Bang Chan	3:05
3.	"Butterflies"	Bang Chan; Versachoi; D&H (Purple Night); Yohei	Bang Chan; Versachoi	Bang Chan; Versachoi	3:10
4.	"Social Path" (instrumental)				3:19
5.	"Butterflies" (instrumental)				3:10
Total length:					16:02

Social Path / Super Bowl (Japanese Ver.) – Limited A bonus track
No.	Title	Director(s)	Length
1.	"Jacket shooting making movie"		15:06
2.	"Social Path" (recording making movie)		14:48
3.	"Super Bowl" (music video)	Jeong Nu-ri (Cosmo)	3:08
4.	"Super Bowl" (music video making movie)		14:59
5.	"The Sound" (music video)	Bang Jae-yeob	3:15
6.	"The Sound" (music video making movie)		11:37
Total length:			1:16:02

Social Path / Super Bowl (Japanese Ver.) – Fanclub bonus track
No.	Title	Length
1.	"Special Video "There" from Stray Kids in Japan"
2.	"Special Video "There" from Stray Kids in Japan" (making movie)

== Credits and personnel ==
Musicians

- Stray Kids – vocals (all), background vocals (all)
  - Bang Chan (3Racha) – vocal directing (all), all instruments (2), programming (2)
- Versachoi – all instruments (1, 3), programming (1, 3), synthesizer (1, 3), keyboard (1, 3), vocal directing (1, 3)
- Nickko Young – guitar (1)
- Zack Djurich – all instruments (2), programming (2)

Technical

- Lee Kyeong-won – digital editing (all)
- Goo Hye-jin – recording (all)
- Lim Chan-mi – recording (2)
- Curtis Douglas – mixing (1)
- Yoon Won-kwon – mixing (2–3)
- Chris Gehringer – mastering (1)
- Kwon Nam-woo – mastering (2–3)

Locations

- Sony Music Entertainment (Japan) Inc. – publishing (all)
- JYP Publishing (KOMCA) – publishing (all)
- JYPE Studios – recording (all)
- Studio DDeepKick – mixing (2–3)
- Sterling Sound – mastering (1)
- 821 Sound Mastering – mastering (2–3)

== Charts ==
=== Weekly charts ===
Weekly chart performance for Social Path / Super Bowl (Japanese Ver.)
Chart (2023)	Peak position
Japanese Albums (Oricon)	1
Japanese Combined Albums (Oricon)	1
Japanese Hot Albums (Billboard Japan)	1

=== Monthly charts ===
Monthly chart performance for Social Path / Super Bowl (Japanese Ver.)
Chart (2023)	Position
Japanese Albums (Oricon)	1

=== Year-end charts ===
2023 year-end chart performance for Social Path / Super Bowl (Japanese Ver.)
Chart (2023)	Position
Japanese Albums (Oricon)	4
Japanese Combined Albums (Oricon)	4
Japanese Hot Albums (Billboard Japan)	3

2024 year-end chart performance for Social Path / Super Bowl (Japanese Ver.)
Chart (2024)	Position
Japanese Hot Albums (Billboard Japan)	68

== Certifications and sales ==
Certifications and sales figures for Social Path / Super Bowl (Japanese Ver.)
Region	Certification	Certified units/sales
Japan (RIAJ) Physical	Million	1,000,000^{^}
Japan Digital	—	747
^{^} Shipments figures based on certification alone.

== Release history ==
Release dates and formats for Social Path / Super Bowl (Japanese Ver.)
Region	Date	Format	Version	Label	Ref.
Japan	September 6, 2023	CD + Blu-ray	Limited A; fanclub	Epic Japan	
Japan	September 6, 2023	CD + SpecialZine	Limited B	Epic Japan	
Japan	September 6, 2023	CD	Regular	Epic Japan	
Various	September 6, 2023	Digital download; streaming	Regular	Epic Japan	
South Korea	September 6, 2023	Digital download; streaming	Regular	JYP	

== See also ==
- List of Oricon number-one albums of 2023
- List of Billboard Japan Hot Albums number ones of 2023
