= Rock-Star (EP) =

- Digital cover

EP by Stray Kids
- Released: November 10, 2023
- Studios: JYPE (Seoul); Chan's "Room" (Seoul)
- Length: 25:35
- Languages: Korean; English
- Labels: JYP; Republic
- Producers: 3Racha; Versachoi; Cubeatz; Willie Weeks; Millionboy; Nickko Young; Jun2

Stray Kids chronology
Social Path / Super Bowl (Japanese Ver.) (2023)	Rock-Star (2023)	Ate (2024)

Singles from Rock-Star
- 1. "Lalalala" Released: November 10, 2023

Rock-Star (stylized as 樂-STAR) is the eighth Korean-language extended play (thirteenth overall) by South Korean boy band Stray Kids, released on November 10, 2023, through JYP Entertainment and Republic Records, five months after their third studio album 5-Star (2023). Based on Korean four-character idiom of emotions huiroaerak, 3Racha, an in-house production team of the group, worked on the EP with Versachoi, Cubeatz, Willie Weeks, Millionboy, Nickko Young, and Jun2.

The EP comprises eight tracks, including "Lalalala" as lead single, and the Korean version of "Social Path", featuring Japanese singer-songwriter Lisa. Commercially, Rock-Star topped national charts in South Korea, Austria, Greece, Hungary, Japan, Poland, and the United States, and was certified quadruple million by Korea Music Content Association (KMCA), as well as gold in France and the United States. According to International Federation of the Phonographic Industry (IFPI), Rock-Star was the ninth global best-selling album in 2023.

== Background ==
On January 1, 2023, Stray Kids uploaded the video "Step Out 2023", outlining their accomplishments in 2022 and plans for the new year, including two album releases. The group's first record of 2023 was their third studio album 5-Star, released on June 2. The album peaked at number one on several national charts, including France, South Korea, and the United States, (Note: See 5-Star (Stray Kids album) § Charts) which was certified five-times Million by Korea Music Content Association (KMCA). In support of the album, Stray Kids embarked on their concert tour 5-Star Dome Tour in South Korea and Japan from August to October. During the tour, the group also released their third Japanese-language EP Social Path / Super Bowl (Japanese Ver.) on September 6.

On September 19, 2023, news outlet Joynews24 reported that Stray Kids scheduled for new album release in November. Shortly, JYP Entertainment confirmed the news. On October 6, the group announced Rock-Star via a one-minute-and-half long prologue video. Narrated by Felix's "calming" and Bang Chan's "manic" and "theatrical" voices, the visual focuses on a boy, a trumpet player of marching band, falling asleep while waiting for a performance, expressing his agitated emotion. The scenes switches to Stray Kids robbing a bank joyfully alongside a group of clowns, becoming angry pirates on the ship, and looking up at a clock sadly. As the boy and his bandmates enter the stage, the rock-inspired heavy electric guitar began playing, and Felix and Bang Chan shout "Let's show them how we rock!".

The Korean title of the EP 樂-Star is a word play with the English title Rock-Star, in which the Sino-Korean pronunciation of 樂 (rak) is similar to rock. With its "close relationship" with the previous album, as described by members, Rock-Star shows more "untamed energy" than the "unique-colored" 5-Star. The concept of Rock-Star is based on the Korean four-character idiom huiroaerak (희로애락; 喜怒哀樂; lit. '"joy, anger, sorrow, pleasure"'), depicting various emotions from the group's perspective.

== Music and lyrics ==
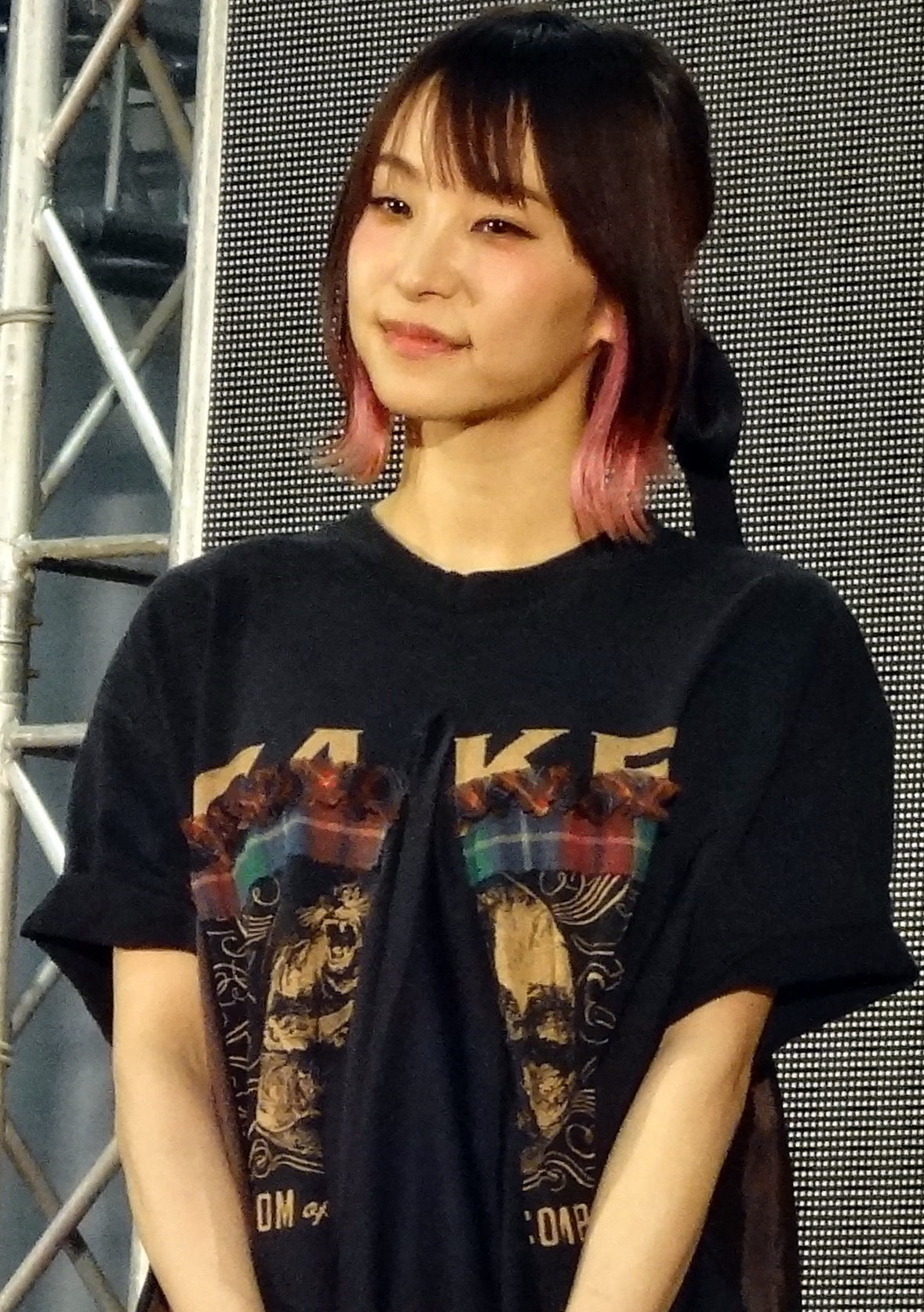
Japanese singer-songwriter Lisa features on "Social Path".

Rock-Star consists of eight tracks with a duration of 25 minutes and 27 seconds. The EP was described as a "powerful album, adding strength and energy to [Stray Kids'] spirit," aiming to "go beyond any evaluation," and showing "the rock star aspect and freedom latenting within [the group]," as well as "our pleasure continues no matter what happen." 3Racha—an in-house production team of Stray Kids members Bang Chan, Changbin, and Han—wrote and produced all songs on the album, and member Hyunjin co-wrote "Cover Me" with Bang Chan. Other contributors include Versachoi, Cubeatz, Luis Bacque, Willie Weeks, Millionboy, Nickko Young, and Jun2. Japanese singer-songwriter Lisa features on the seventh track "Social Path", recorded in Korean instead of Japanese, which was originally included on the group's Japanese EP Social Path / Super Bowl (Japanese Ver.).

== Release and promotion ==
Rock-Star was released on November 10, 2023. EP pre-orders began on the same day as the prologue's release, coming in five editions: limited "Star", and four standards "Rock", "Roll", "Postcard", and "Headliner". The EP's track list, scheduler, and digital cover artwork were posted to social media on October 9, confirming "Lalalala" as the lead single, as well as a rock rearranged version, and including the Korean version of "Social Path". Two songs from the EP—"Megaverse" and "Leave"—were teased via "Unveil: Track" series on October 20 and 24, respectively. Stray Kids held two shows of their 5-Star Dome Tour in Seoul, subtitled "Seoul Special (Unveil 13)" from October 21 to 22, where they first performed three tracks from Rock-Star: "Megaverse", "Blind Spot", "Leave", and the Korean version of "Social Path"; the performances of "Megaverse" and "Leave" were uploaded on October 26. The EP's mashup video was released on November 6. Stray Kids introduced the EP via the video Intro "Rock-Star", uploaded on November 9.

A series of teaser images were released in four sets. In the first, members wear rock star outfits, posting in a bathtub full of amplifier cables and vinyls. The second depicts members, wearing balletcore costumes, standing in front of a satellite dish and tinting blue–purple. The third shows members with lion statues and head mannequins. The fourth expresses members, wearing same looks as the first teaser images, in a magazine-style photoshoot with pink headline and interviews about choosing between "樂" and "rock". Two music videos supported the EP. For the lead single "Lalalala", released concurrently with the album, the video expresses clash of inside emotions by Stray Kids and gigantic smoke-like creature attempts to attack a marching band of young boys during performing. The music video of "Megaverse" was released on November 20, showing Stray Kids knock out security guard, starring Yoon Seung-hoon. At the final scene, rapper Tablo surprisingly appeared as a new security guard. Stray Kids performed "Lalalala" at several domestic music programs: Music Bank, Show! Music Core, Inkigayo, and M Countdown. Additionally, the pop-up store of the EP opened in Seoul, South Korea, running from November 12 to 26. Changbin and Felix appeared as guests at variety show Amazing Saturday on November 18.

=== SKZflix ===
SKZflix was first teased on the video "Step Out 2022", uploaded on January 1, 2022. Its teaser video premiered on October 21, 2023, at 5-Star Dome Tour "Seoul Special (Unveil 13)". SKZflix was officially released as a short film on November 3, featuring two songs from Rock-Star: "Leave" and "Cover Me", and directed by Kim Byeong-june. The Short Shorts Film Festival & Asia chose SKZflix to be the festival's opening screening, and gave the Global Spotlight Award for the short film.

The story begins with Lee Know, a university student with a scar on his face, startled by the sudden presence of Felix; they have a conversation about the dream of becoming an actor. Both are invited by Han and Seungmin to star in the short film produced by the university's film club for a film festival. The film is about a "parallel world where the main character comes to meet old friends and has to go back". On the premiere day, Lee Know asks the others about Felix, but everyone cannot remember him, so Lee Know sets out to find Felix, who has suddenly disappeared. Finally, Lee Know comes to supermarket and finds Felix, who also has a scar on his face.

== Critical reception ==
Professional ratings
Review scores
Source	Rating
AllMusic	4.5/5 stars

Crystal Bell from Teen Vogue described that Rock-Star "finds Stray Kids broadening their creative palette while revisiting their more rebellious roots." Writing for AllMusic, Neil Z. Yeung called the EP as a "star-making collection for a group already firing on all cylinders, bringing an almost unbearable energy with yet another collection of hybrid dance anthems that are boosted by muscular, swaggering rap attacks." Dazed named "Cover Me" the 25th best K-pop track of 2023, calling it a "glimmering pearl in the Rock-Star jewellery box, a near-ballad that chronicles being caught in soul-emptying sadness".

== Accolades ==
List of awards and nominations received by Rock-Star
Ceremony	Year	Category	Result	Ref.
Billboard Music Awards	2024	Top K-Pop Album	Nominated	
MAMA Awards	2024	Album of the Year	Nominated	
Melon Music Awards	2024	Millions Top 10	Nominated	

== Commercial performance ==
In South Korea, according to Hanteo Chart, Rock-Star sold 1,885,065 copies on the release date. The EP debuted at number one on the Circle Album Chart with 3,650,904 copies for limited and standard editions and 177,901 copies for Nemo edition. It later topped the monthly chart, selling 4,126,466 copies, and certified four million by Korea Music Content Association. Rock-Star landed at number one on the Oricon Albums Chart and Combined Albums Chart, the third after The Sound, and Social Path / Super Bowl (Japanese Ver.), selling 128,000 copies on its first week. Internationally, the EP reached number two in Australia, France, and Germany.

In the United States, Rock-Star entered the Billboard 200 at number one, dated November 25, 2023, for fourth consecutive album, making Stray Kids the first act to have first four chart entries debuting at number one since Alicia Keys (2001–2007), (Note: Songs in A Minor (2001), The Diary of Alicia Keys (2003), Unplugged (2005), and As I Am (2007)) and One Direction (2012–2014). (Note: Up All Night (2011), Take Me Home (2012), Midnight Memories (2013), and Four (2014), excluding iTunes Festival: London 2012.) The EP became the twenty-second overall non-English language album to top the chart, and the sixth in 2023, Rock-Star debuted with 224,000 equivalent album units, comprising 213,000 pure sales, and 11,000 streaming equivalent albums, equaling 15.68 million on-demand streams. In 2024, Rock-Star received gold certifications from Recording Industry Association of America (RIAA), and French Syndicat national de l'édition phonographique.

According to the International Federation of the Phonographic Industry (IFPI)'s Global Music Report for 2023, Rock-Star was the ninth most-consumed album across all formats, and the best-selling album worldwide, having sold 4.2 million units. (Note: The IFPI Global Albums chart ranks, in order, the albums that generated the most money globally across streaming, download, and physical record sales (combined) in a calendar year. The Global Album Sales Chart measures global unit sales across all physical formats, as well as full album downloads.)

== Track listing ==
Rock-Star track listing
No.	Title	Lyrics	Music	Arrangement	Length
1.	"Megaverse"	Bang Chan (3Racha); Changbin (3Racha); Han (3Racha)	Bang Chan; Changbin; Han; Versachoi	Versachoi; Bang Chan	3:06
2.	"Lalalala" (락 (樂))	Bang Chan; Changbin; Han	Bang Chan; Changbin; Han; Versachoi; Kevin Gomringer; Tim Gomringer; Luis Bacque	Versachoi; Bang Chan; Cubeatz	3:02
3.	"Blind Spot" (사각지대)	Bang Chan; Changbin; Han	Bang Chan; Changbin; Han; Willie Weeks	Weeks; Bang Chan	3:21
4.	"Comflex"	Bang Chan; Changbin; Han	Bang Chan; Changbin; Han; Millionboy	Millionboy	2:52
5.	"Cover Me" (가려줘)	Hyunjin; Bang Chan	Hyunjin; Bang Chan; Nickko Young	Bang Chan; Young	3:11
6.	"Leave"	Bang Chan; Changbin	Bang Chan; Changbin; Jun2	Jun2; Bang Chan	3:39
7.	"Social Path" (featuring Lisa; Korean version)	Bang Chan; Changbin; Han	Bang Chan; Changbin; Han; Versachoi	Versachoi	3:17
8.	"Lalalala" (rock version)	Bang Chan; Changbin; Han	Bang Chan; Changbin; Han; Versachoi; K. Gomringer; T. Gomringer; Bacque	Versachoi; Bang Chan; Cubeatz; Young	3:08
Total length:					25:35

== Credits and personnel ==
Musicians

- Stray Kids – lead vocals (all), background vocals (2, 7–8)
  - Bang Chan (3Racha) – background vocals (1, 3–6), all instruments (1–2, 5–6), computer programming (6)
  - Changbin (3Racha) – background vocals (1, 4)
  - Han (3Racha) – background vocals (1, 3–4)
- Versachoi – all instruments (1–2, 7), programming (1–2, 7), synthesizer (7), keyboard (7)
- Cubeatz – all instruments (2)
- Willie Weeks – all instruments (3), programming (3)
- Millionboy – synthesizer (4), drums (4), bass guitar (4), programming (4)
- Nickko Young – all instruments (5), guitar (6–8)
- Jun2 – programming (6)
- Lee Jae-myung – bass guitar (8)

Technical

- Lee Kyeong-won – digital editing (all)
- Goo Hye-jin – recording (1–2, 4–8)
- Bang Chan (3Racha) – recording (1, 4)
- Lim Chan-mi – recording (3)
- Yoon Won-kwon – mixing (1, 3, 6)
- Lee Tae-sub – mixing (2, 5, 8)
- Stay Tuned – mixing (4)
- Curtis Douglas – mixing (7)
- Kwon Nam-woo – mastering (1, 3–6)
- Dave Kutch – mastering (2, 8)
- Chris Gehringer – mastering (7)
- Shin Bong-won – Dolby Atmos mixing (all)
  - Park Nam-joon – assistant

Locations

- JYP Publishing (KOMCA) – original publishing (all), sub-publishing (all)
- Songs of Universal, Inc. (BMI) – original publishing (2, 8), sub-publishing (2, 8)
- InnerV8 Musiq – original publishing (3)
- Beyond Love – sub-publishing (3)
- Copyright Control – original publishing (4–5, 8), sub-publishing (4–5, 8)
- JYPE Studios – recording (all), mixing (2, 5, 8)
- Chan's "Room" – recording (1, 4)
- MadMiiX – mixing (1, 3, 6)
- Stay Tuned Studio – mixing (4)
- 821 Sound Mastering – mastering (1, 3–6)
- The Mastering Palace – mastering (2, 8)
- Sterling Sound – mastering (7)
- GLAB Studios – Dolby Atmos mixing (all)

== Charts ==
=== Weekly charts ===
Weekly chart performance for Rock-Star
Chart (2023–2024)	Peak position
Australian Albums (ARIA)	2
Austrian Albums (Ö3 Austria)	1
Belgian Albums (Ultratop Flanders)	6
Belgian Albums (Ultratop Wallonia)	2
Canadian Albums (Billboard)	21
Croatian International Albums (HDU)	1
Danish Albums (Hitlisten)	4
Dutch Albums (Album Top 100)	12
Finnish Albums (Suomen virallinen lista)	15
French Albums (SNEP)	2
German Albums (Offizielle Top 100)	2
Greek Albums (IFPI)	1
Hungarian Albums (MAHASZ)	1
Italian Albums (FIMI)	7
Japanese Albums (Oricon)	1
Japanese Combined Albums (Oricon)	1
Japanese Hot Albums (Billboard Japan)	9
Lithuanian Albums (AGATA)	3
New Zealand Albums (RMNZ)	11
Norwegian Albums (VG-lista)	2
Polish Albums (ZPAV)	1
South Korean Albums (Circle)	1
Spanish Albums (Promusicae)	6
Swedish Albums (Sverigetopplistan)	31
Swiss Albums (Schweizer Hitparade)	4
UK Albums (Official Charts)	69
UK Independent Albums (Official Charts)	16
US Billboard 200	1
US World Albums (Billboard)	1

=== Monthly charts ===
Monthly chart performance for Rock-Star
Chart (2023)	Position
Japanese Albums (Oricon)	4
South Korean Albums (Circle)	1

=== Year-end charts ===
2023 year-end chart performance for Rock-Star
Chart (2023)	Position
Austrian Albums (Ö3 Austria)	51
Belgian Albums (Ultratop Wallonia)	186
French Albums (SNEP)	135
German Albums (Offizielle Top 100)	91
Global Albums (IFPI)	9
Hungarian Albums (MAHASZ)	41
Japanese Albums (Oricon)	30
Japanese Download Albums (Billboard Japan)	62
Polish Albums (ZPAV)	64
South Korean Albums (Circle)	4

2024 year-end chart performance for Rock-Star
Chart (2024)	Position
Croatian International Albums (HDU)	11
French Albums (SNEP)	191
Japanese Albums (Oricon)	97
US Billboard 200	123
US World Albums (Billboard)	1

== Certifications and sales ==
Certifications and sales for Rock-Star
Region	Certification	Certified units/sales
France (SNEP)	Gold	50,000^{‡}
Japan	—	229,835 (Note: Combined Japan sales for Rock-Star: Physical sales: 225,897; Digital sales: 3,938)
South Korea (KMCA)	4× Million	4,000,000^{^}
United States (RIAA)	Gold	500,000^{‡}
Summaries
Worldwide (IFPI)	—	4,200,000
^{^} Shipments figures based on certification alone.^{‡} Sales+streaming figures based on certification alone.

== Release history ==
Release dates and formats for Rock-Star
Region	Date	Format	Version	Label	Ref.
Various	November 10, 2023	CD; digital download; streaming	Limited; standard	JYP; Republic	
South Korea	November 10, 2023	Nemo	Nemo	JYP; Republic	
United States	November 15, 2023	Digital download	Exclusive digital	JYP; Republic	

== See also ==
- List of Billboard 200 number-one albums of 2023
- List of Circle Album Chart number ones of 2023
- List of number-one hits of 2023 (Austria)
- List of Oricon number-one albums of 2023
