= Lalalala =

2023 single by Stray Kids

Single by Stray Kids

from the EP Rock-Star
- Language: Korean; English
- Released: November 10, 2023
- Studio: JYPE (Seoul)
- Genre: Afrobeats; drift phonk
- Length: 3:02
- Label: JYP; Republic
- Composers: Bang Chan; Changbin; Han; Versachoi; Kevin Gomringer; Tim Gomringer; Luis Bacque
- Lyricists: Bang Chan; Changbin; Han

Stray Kids singles chronology
"Social Path" (2023)	"Lalalala" (2023)	"Lose My Breath" (2024)

Music video
- "Lalalala" on YouTube

Professional ratings
Review scores
Source	Rating
IZM	2.5/5 stars

"Lalalala" (Korean: 락; Hanja: 樂; RR: Rak; lit. ''pleasure'') is a song by South Korean boy band Stray Kids, taken from their eighth Korean-language extended play Rock-Star. It was released as the EP's lead single on November 10, 2023, through JYP Entertainment and Republic Records. A drift phonk and Afrobeats track, the song was written by 3Racha, Versachoi, Cubeatz, and Luis Bacque about celebration of life and how to enjoy it. "Lalalala" peaked at number six on the Circle Digital Chart, became the group's first entry on the Billboard Hot 100 at number 90, as well as first top ten on the Billboard Global 200.

== Background and composition ==
"Lalalala" was written by 3Racha, an in-house production team of Stray Kids members Bang Chan, Changbin, and Han, and co-composed with Versachoi, Kevin Gomringer and Tim Gomringer from Cubeatz, and Luis Bacque in November 2022, and intended to be included the group's third studio album 5-Star as the lead single, but it was replaced by "S-Class". During the recording session, the group felt the song is suitable for being a lead single and performing on stage. Therefore, the song was outtaked from 5-Star, which included "Item" instead.

On October 6, 2023, Stray Kids announced their eighth Korean-language extended play Rock-Star set to be released on November 10, 2023. The EP's track list was revealed on October 9, marking the second track "Lalalala" as its lead single, as well as the rock version. The song was first previewed on the EP's mashup video on November 6. The song's Korean title "락 (樂)" (pronounced rak; means "pleasure") is a word play with "rock", expressing the meaning of "although you will feel any emotions in life, you hope the last emotion you choose will be pleasure". Musically, "Lalalala" is a drift phonk and Afrobeats track with "harsh" electric guitar, "lively" drums, and "thumping" bass, talking about celebration of their life, pushing through all kinds of pain to find joy and release through music.

== Commercial performance ==
In South Korea, "Lalalala" debuted at number 33 on the Circle Digital Chart for the issue dated November 5–11, 2023, and rose to number six the next week, Stray Kids' first top ten and highest peak on the chart. The song first entered the Billboard Japan Hot 100 dated November 15 at number 33 and ascended to number eight the next week. In Europe, "Lalalala" peaked at number 44 on the UK Singles Chart, and number 74 on the French Top Singles.

The song landed at number ten on the Billboard Global 200 and number six on the Global Excl. US, dated November 25, 2023, making Stray Kids their first top-ten entries and highest peaks on both charts, surpassing "Maniac" (21 and 15, respectively). The song earned 44.7 million streams and 9,000 digital sales worldwide. In the United States, "Lalalala" entered Billboard Hot 100 for the first time at number 90 with 3,000 downloads and 6.1 million streams in the United States, becoming the seventh South Korean group to do so, following Wonder Girls, BTS, Blackpink, Twice, NewJeans, and Fifty Fifty, as well as the second boy band after BTS. Additionally, "Lalalala" was the fourth song to top the World Digital Song Sales after "Mixtape: Oh", "Maniac", and "Case 143".

== Music video ==
An accompanying music video for "Lalalala" was uploaded on November 10, 2023, concurrently with the EP Rock-Star release, preceded by one teaser video. Directed by Bang Jae Yeob, the visual depicts clash of inside emotions, and pleasure ultimately wins at the end. It shows Stray Kids' dance performance in different sets: shipwreck, a bank robbery, an army, and a white background, and alternate with gigantic smoke-like creature attempts to attack both Stray Kids and a marching band of young boys during performing. At the end, the group and backup dancers salute to the marching band through a portal. Teen Vogue chosen the music video for "Lalalala" is one of the best K-pop music video in 2023. The music video reached 100 million views in January 2024.

== Live performances ==
Stray Kids promoted and performed "Lalalala" at several domestic music programs from November 10 to 19: Music Bank, Show! Music Core, Inkigayo, and M Countdown. The group performed the song and "S-Class" at the 2023 Billboard Music Awards on November 19. "Lalalala" was also performed at several award shows and year-end music festivals, including Asia Artist Awards, KBS Song Festival, and SBS Gayo Daejeon.

== Accolades ==
Billboard named "Lalalala" number 11 in their list of The 25 Best K-pop Songs of 2023, writing that it speaks "to pushing through all kinds of pain to find joy and release as they do through music and to 'just feel the rock.'" Nylon named its remix the "Best Rock Remix" in K-pop of 2023.

Awards and nominations for "Lalalala"
Ceremony	Year	Award	Result	Ref.
MAMA Awards	2024	Song of the Year	Nominated	
MAMA Awards	2024	Best Dance Performance – Male Group	Nominated	
MTV Video Music Awards	2024	Best K-Pop	Nominated	

Music program awards for "Lalalala"
Program	Date	Ref.
Show Champion	November 15, 2023	
Music Bank	November 17, 2023	
Show! Music Core	November 18, 2023	

== Credits and personnel ==
Personnel

- Stray Kids – lead vocals, background vocals
  - Bang Chan (3Racha) – lyrics, composition, arrangement, all instruments
  - Changbin (3Racha) – lyrics, composition
  - Han (3Racha) – lyrics, composition
- Versachoi – composition, arrangement, all instruments, programming
- Cubeatz (Kevin and Tim Gomringer) – composition, arrangement, all instruments
- Luis Bacque – composition, publishing
- Nickko Young – arrangement (rock version), guitar (rock version)
- Lee Jae-myung – bass guitar (rock version)
- Lee Kyeong-won – digital editing
- Goo Hye-jin – recording
- Lee Tae-sub – mixing
- Dave Kutch – mastering

Locations

- JYP Publishing (KOMCA) – original publishing, sub-publishing
- Songs of Universal, Inc. (BMI) – original publishing, sub-publishing
- JYPE Studios – recording, mixing
- The Mastering Palace – mastering

== Charts ==
=== Weekly charts ===
Weekly chart performance for "Lalalala"
Chart (2023)	Peak position
Australia (ARIA)	64
Austria (Ö3 Austria Top 40)	73
Canada Hot 100 (Billboard)	65
Czech Republic Singles Digital (ČNS IFPI)	60
France (SNEP)	74
Global 200 (Billboard)	10
Hong Kong (Billboard)	21
Ireland (IRMA)	79
Japan Hot 100 (Billboard)	9
Japan Combined Singles (Oricon)	8
Latvia (LAIPA)	5
Lithuania (AGATA)	12
Malaysia (Billboard)	17
Malaysia International (RIM)	11
Netherlands (Global Top 40)	21
New Zealand Hot Singles (RMNZ)	8
Poland (Polish Streaming Top 100)	41
Portugal (AFP)	119
Singapore (RIAS)	10
Slovakia Singles Digital (ČNS IFPI)	37
South Korea (Circle)	6
Switzerland (Schweizer Hitparade)	78
Taiwan (Billboard)	14
UK Singles (Official Charts)	44
UK Independent (Official Charts)	12
US Billboard Hot 100	90
US World Digital Song Sales (Billboard)	1
Vietnam (Vietnam Hot 100)	78

=== Monthly charts ===
Monthly chart performance for "Lalalala"
Chart (2023)	Position
South Korea (Circle)	46

=== Year-end charts ===
Year-end chart performance for "Lalalala"
Chart (2023)	Position
South Korea Download (Circle)	51

== Certifications ==
Certifications for "Lalalala"
Region	Certification	Certified units/sales
United States (RIAA)	Gold	500,000^{‡}
Streaming
Japan (RIAJ)	Gold	50,000,000^{†}
^{‡} Sales+streaming figures based on certification alone.^{†} Streaming-only figures based on certification alone.

== See also ==
- List of Music Bank Chart winners (2023)
- List of Show Champion Chart winners (2023)
- List of Show! Music Core Chart winners (2023)
