= Ate (EP) =

- Digital cover

EP by Stray Kids
- Released: July 19, 2024
- Studios: JYPE (Seoul); Channie's "Room" (Seoul)
- Genres: Hip-hop; drum and bass
- Length: 23:21
- Languages: Korean; English
- Labels: JYP; Republic
- Producers: 3Racha; Chae Gang-hae; DallasK; Restart; Space Primates; Versachoi

Stray Kids chronology
| Rock-Star (2023) | Ate (2024) | Giant (2024) |

Singles from Ate
- 1. "Chk Chk Boom" Released: July 19, 2024

Ate is the ninth Korean-language extended play (fourteenth overall) by South Korean boy band Stray Kids. It was released on July 19, 2024, through JYP Entertainment and Republic Records, eight months after its predecessor Rock-Star (2023). Described as "definitely" something they have not done, the in-house production team 3Racha worked on the EP with collaborators including Versachoi, DallasK, Restart, Chae Gang-hae, and Space Primates. "Chk Chk Boom" was promoted as Ate's lead single, accompanied by a music video co-starring actors Ryan Reynolds and Hugh Jackman.

In support of Ate, Stray Kids appeared on several television and web shows and embarked on their third worldwide concert tour Dominate, starting in August 2024. Commercially, the EP peaked at number one in South Korea, as well as Austria, Belgium, France, Hungary, Poland, Portugal, and the United States. It has sold 3 million copies, and, according to the International Federation of the Phonographic Industry (IFPI), became the tenth best-selling album globally in 2024. Ate was certified triple-million by the Korea Music Content Association (KMCA) and golds by the Recording Industry Association of America (RIAA) and the Syndicat national de l'édition phonographique (SNEP).

== Background ==
Stray Kids began working on Ate in October 2023, a month before the release of their previous EP Rock-Star. The group uploaded the video "Step Out 2024" to their social media on January 1, 2024, outlining their accomplishments in 2023 and plans for the next year, including "one album and one special album". News outlet Ilgan Sports and Hana Securities wrote about the expectation of the group's new album to be released in mid-2024, specified to be in June, while a Hyundai Motor Securities Researcher predicted it to be in June or July. On May 9, a day before the single "Lose My Breath"'s release, StarNews reported that the group would release a new Korean-language album on July 19. Shortly after, JYP Entertainment announced that they did not confirm the date and would announce it later. In May, members Han and I.N were spotted in SoHo, New York City during the music video filming. An article written by W Korea in early June also mentioned July 19 as the upcoming album's release date.

On June 18, Stray Kids released the 56th episode of their variety web series SKZ-Code, titled "Bedtime Bingo Hell #2". It included four 18-second unskippable parody commercials for a fictional fortune cookie brand named Ate, with each member asking "Who ate the luck?". The next day, JYP announced the EP to be titled Ate with a release date slated for July 19. The announcement was accompanied by a trailer that begins with the Felix version of the commercial. The camera then pans from advertising to reality and shows the band opening the fortune cookie with the phrase "your luck no longer lasts from now on". After that, the members experience a series of unfortunate incidents, making them wandering everywhere to find the new fortune cookies to regain their luck. The video also confirmed that the lead single would be titled "Chk Chk Boom". The EP's title is a word play between a past tense of "to eat", including the Internet slang for "nail it", and the number of Stray Kids' members, "eight".

== Music and lyrics ==
Ate is 23 minutes and 21 seconds long, consisting of eight tracks. Prior to the release, Stray Kids described the EP as "definitely" something that they have not done before with a lot of "challenges" and "firsts" yet very "genuine and authentic", and they also think fans would not expect this music style. Han explained in Ate press conference that the EP "convey[s] restrained and latent energy, while still keeping it engaging," and "expanded the genres of the B-side tracks to make the album more diverse," compared to the previous records which had more "explosive and exuberant energy".

=== Songs ===
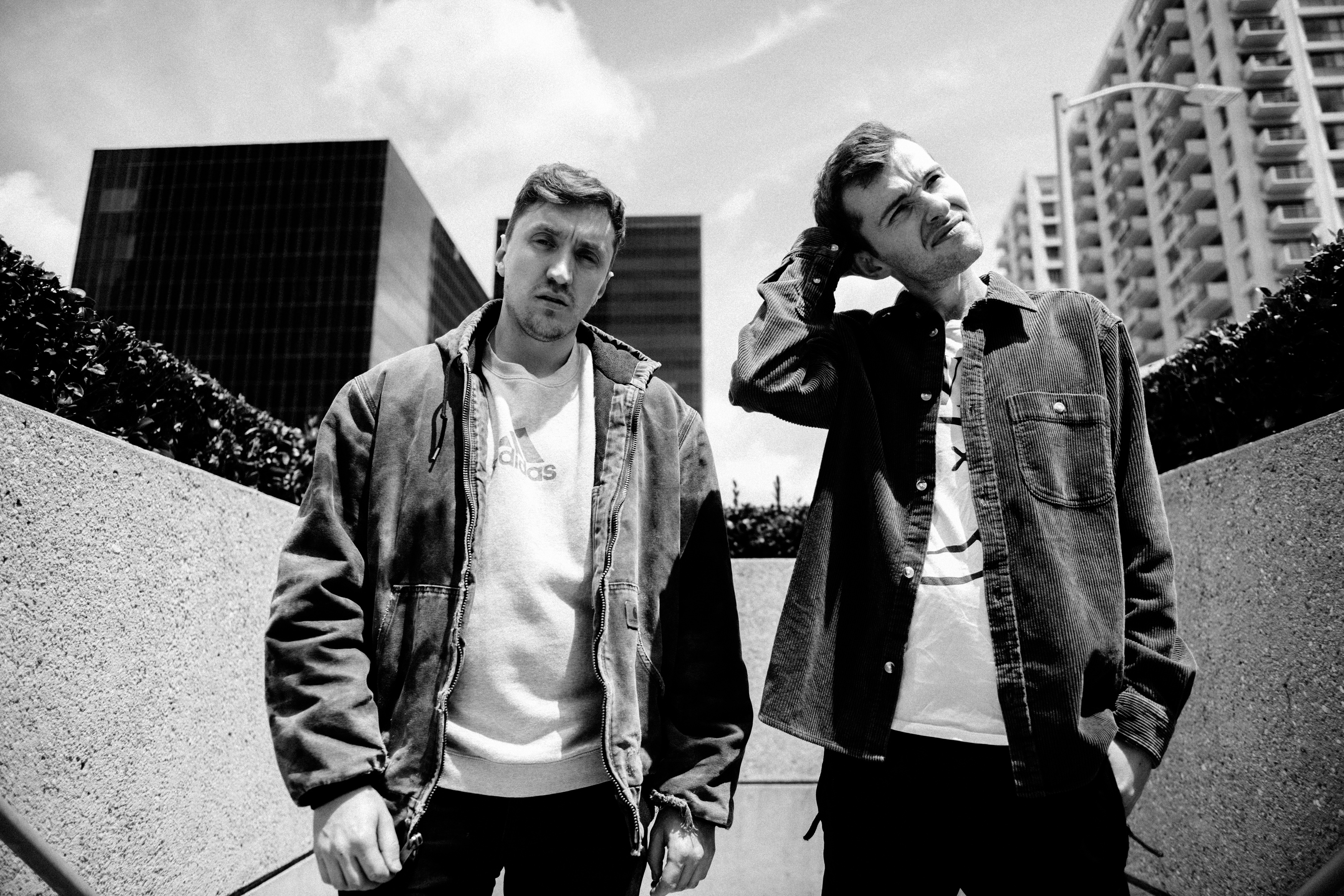
Space Primates (pictured) co-wrote and co-produced "I Like It".

Ate opens with the rap-rock "Mountains", expressing introspective lyrics that reflects struggles and overcoming obstacles, which is compared to climbing to the top of a mountain. It is reminiscent of their songs such as "Victory Song" and "Hall of Fame". A Latin-styled hip-hop and reggaeton track, "Chk Chk Boom" talks about the "confidence to aim at the desired target more perfectly than anyone else." Further complementing the Latin music influence, the song includes some Spanish words and accents alongside the Korean and English lyrics. "Jjam" is described as the group's signature hip-hop track, showing Stray Kids having fun and joy. It uses peanut butter and jelly sandwich imagery and Korean slang "no jam" (노잼), meaning "not fun". Another hip-hop with trap and psychedelic-like beats, the drill and drum and bass track "I Like It" is about wanting to keep and enjoy the feeling of a fling relationship without the pressures of love, like a situationship.

The entire English-language "Runners" is a cyberpunk-inspired drill and drum and bass track with the themes of perseverance and confidence of chasing dreams in both power and hardship's sides. A blend of jazz and bossa nova led by piano, a "different side" to Stray Kids, "Twilight" depicts the regrets of losing a loved one, and longing and emptiness for the other person with monologue-like manner. Titled after the group's name, "Stray Kids", a drum and bass song that chronicles the musical journey in the past seven years of the group, showcasing their self-esteem, pride, and ambition. It references the group's numerous earlier songs, e.g. "Hellevator", "Miroh", "Blueprint", "Haven", "Lonely St.", etc. The EP closes with the "Festival" version of "Chk Chk Boom", which was rearranged to be sped-up and include EDM elements.

== Release and promotion ==
Ate was released on July 19, 2024. Pre-orders of the EP began on June 19, coming in five versions—Ate, Chk Chk, Boom, Accordion, and Letter, as well as pre-save. Following the EP announcement, the group revealed the 3D animated vending machine-styled promotional itinerary on June 20, and, the next day, flyer-styled track listing and digital cover artwork of a metallic dental model decorated with Stray Kids-shaped grills. The series of individual, duo, and group teaser images and videos were posted in four sets. The first shows the "wild and free" and "hip and chic" members donning in black, white, and denim, engaging in different activities. The second depicts the members posing in front of their portrait background, and uses cane, metallic accessories, and dreamy red lights as props. The third expresses the members at a drained swimming pool, replaced with sand and cacti. The fourth shows another "hip"-style of the members wearing tooth gems, nail arts, and bold accessories with the background of a large structure of the beast's fangs.

Two tracks from Ate—"Mountains" and "Stray Kids"—were teased as part of video series "Unveil: Track", and were included alongside other tracks on the EP's mashup video, which features visuals of Stray Kids in a CD factory. The day before its release, the group introduced the EP via the video Intro: Ate. Four music videos from Ate's tracks were uploaded: the lead single "Chk Chk Boom" premiered concurrently with Ate, and co-starred Canadian-American actor Ryan Reynolds and Australian actor Hugh Jackman wearing Deadpool and Wolverine costumes, respectively; the next two are "Mountains" and "Stray Kids" as part of their commemoration of the sixth anniversary of their fan club name announcement, called "Stay"; and the Ghostbusters-inspired "Jjam", released on August 7. To promote Ate, the members appeared on several television and web shows, including The King of Mask Singer, LeeMujin Service, Radio Star, Amazing Saturday, MMTG, Heat Eaters, and Knowing Bros, etc. Members Bang Chan and Felix hosted the group's own radio show All About Stray Kids Radio via Apple Music 1 between July 16 and 30 for four episodes, and the group launched a pop-up store from July 20 to August 1 at Empty, Seongsu-dong, Seoul.

The group performed "Chk Chk Boom" and "Jjam" at several music programs: Music Bank, Show! Music Core, 2024 SBS Gayo Daejeon Summer, M Countdown, and Inkigayo. In support of Ate, Stray Kids embarked on their third worldwide concert tour, titled Dominate World Tour, starting at KSPO Dome in Seoul on August 24, and being travelling in Asia, Australia, Latin America, North America, and Europe. The group also headlined three overseas music festivals—I-Days in Milan, Italy, BST Hyde Park in London, England in July, and Lollapalooza in Chicago, United States in August. Additionally, the group appeared on the covers and gave interviews for the May issue of AtStar1, the volume six of 2024 of W Korea, including one group cover and 16 solo covers, two covers per member, and the October–November 2024 issue of Rolling Stone UK, the latter became the first K-pop act ever to appear on the cover.

== Critical reception ==
Professional ratings
Review scores
| Source | Rating |
|---|---|
| AllMusic | 4/5 stars |
| IZM | 2.5/5 stars |

Jeong Ki-yeop from IZM gave Ate 2.5 out of five stars, commenting that "the meaning and purpose of each song is clear, but it is not a charm that leads listening. If you look at it separately as a single, it can be great. However, the grammar of one song and one album are different." Jeong summarized the EP as "The taste of the signature menu is excellent, but the side dishes are not up to par. The main songs that will lead the atmosphere of the future concerts are excellent, but it is difficult to expect more attraction than that." AllMusic's David Crone awarded 4 out of five stars and described that Ate "negotiates between the group's original sound and […] a sonic rush peppered with references across their career." The track "Stray Kids" was chosen by Paste for one of the 20 best K-pop songs of 2024.

Critics' rankings of Ate
| Publication | Accolade | Rank | Ref. |
|---|---|---|---|
| Billboard | The 25 Best K-Pop Albums of 2024 | 19 | |
| Teen Vogue | 15 Best Non-English Albums of 2024 | —N/a | |

== Commercial performance ==
According to Hanteo Chart, Ate sold 1,654,332 copies on its release date, becoming Stray Kids' fourth album to reach this milestone, following Maxident (2022), 5-Star, and Rock-Star (both 2023). In South Korea, the EP debuted at number one and the Nemo format at number four on the Circle Album Chart, selling 2,654,572 and 199,840 copies, respectively. It sold 2,723,327 CDs and 210,794 Nemo copies in July, and later surpassed 3 million cumulative copies as of early August. Ate received three-million certification in April 2026. Internationally, Ate topped the French SNEP Top Albums for two non-consecutive weeks with 17,992 and 4,760 album-equivalent units, respectively, Belgian Ultratop Albums Top 200 in both Flanders and Wallonia regions, and Greek Top Albums Sales for seven consecutive weeks, etc. The EP reached number two on the Australian, German, Japanese, and Swiss album charts, etc. In December 2024, Ate received gold certification from the Syndicat national de l'édition phonographique (SNEP).

In the United States, Ate entered Billboard 200 at number one, becoming the first musical group to top the chart with their first five-consecutive charted albums, (Note: Oddinary, Maxident (both 2022), 5-Star, and Rock-Star (both 2023)) and the second overall act to do so after DMX. (Note: It's Dark and Hell Is Hot (1998), Flesh of My Flesh, Blood of My Blood (1999), ... And Then There Was X (2000), The Great Depression (2001) and Grand Champ (2003).) It was also the 25th mostly non-English-language album to top the chart and the second in 2024 after labelmate Twice's With You-th. According to Luminate, the EP sold 232,000 album-equivalent units—the biggest sales week by a Korean act, and the sixth overall of 2024—comprising 218,000 pure copies and 19.05 million on-demand streams; the former making the EP the K-pop largest sales week and the second overall, following 1.91-million copies of Taylor Swift's The Tortured Poets Department. It resulted in Stray Kids re-topping the Artist 100 for fourth week. The EP also topped three other charts: Top Album Sales and Top Current Album Sales for two consecutive weeks, and World Albums for eight non-consecutive weeks. The EP charted on the latter chart for 100 weeks as of 2026. Four tracks from the EP: "Chk Chk Boom", "Mountains", "Jjam", and "Twilight", entered World Digital Song Sales at number one, seven, nine, and ten, respectively. In October, JYP reported that Ate becoming the best-selling Korean-language and fourth overall pure album in the United States as of September, and the Recording Industry Association of America (RIAA) certified the EP gold, surpassing 500,000 units in the country.

== Accolades ==
List of awards and nominations received by Ate
| Ceremony | Year | Category | Result | Ref. |
|---|---|---|---|---|
| Asian Pop Music Awards | 2024 | Best Album of the Year (Overseas) | Nominated | |
| Asian Pop Music Awards | 2024 | Best Group (Overseas) | Nominated | |
| Billboard Music Awards | 2024 | Top K-Pop Album | Nominated | |
| Golden Disc Awards | 2025 | Best Album (Bonsang) | Won | |
| iHeartRadio Music Awards | 2025 | K-pop Album of the Year | Won | |

== Track listing ==
Ate track listing
| No. | Title | Lyrics | Music | Arrangement | Length |
|---|---|---|---|---|---|
| 1. | "Mountains" | Bang Chan (3Racha); Changbin (3Racha); Han (3Racha) | Bang Chan; Changbin; Han; Versachoi | Versachoi; Bang Chan | 3:07 |
| 2. | "Chk Chk Boom" | Bang Chan; Changbin; Han | Bang Chan; Changbin; Han; Dallas Koehlke; Ronnie Icon; BB Elliot | DallasK; Bang Chan; Restart; Chae Gang-hae | 2:28 |
| 3. | "Jjam" | Bang Chan; Changbin | Bang Chan; Changbin; Restart; Chae | Restart; Chae; Bang Chan | 3:05 |
| 4. | "I Like It" | Bang Chan; Changbin; Han; JBach | Bang Chan; Changbin; Han; Nathan Cunningham; Marc Sibley; JBach | Space Primates; Bang Chan | 2:28 |
| 5. | "Runners" | Bang Chan; Felix | Bang Chan; Felix; Versachoi | Versachoi | 3:16 |
| 6. | "Twilight" (또 다시 밤) | Han | Han; Restart; Chae | Restart; Chae | 3:12 |
| 7. | "Stray Kids" | Bang Chan; Changbin; Han | Bang Chan; Changbin; Han; Koehlke; Ronnie Icon | DallasK | 3:09 |
| 8. | "Chk Chk Boom" (festival version) | Bang Chan; Changbin; Han | Bang Chan; Changbin; Han; Koehlke; Ronnie Icon; BB Elliot | DallasK; Bang Chan; Restart; Chae | 2:33 |
| Total length: | | | | | 23:21 |

== Credits and personnel ==
Musicians

- Stray Kids – lead vocals
  - Bang Chan (3Racha) – background vocals (1–5, 7–8), instruments (1–2, 8), computer programming (1)
  - Changbin (3Racha) – background vocals (1–4, 7–8)
  - Han (3Racha) – background vocals (1–2, 4, 6–8)
  - Felix – background vocals (1–2, 5, 8)
  - Seungmin – background vocals (3)
  - I.N – background vocals (3)
- Versachoi – instruments (1, 5), computer programming (1, 5)
- DallasK – instruments (2, 7–8)
- Restart – instruments (2, 3, 6, 8)
- Chae Gang-hae – instruments (2, 3, 6, 8)
- Space Primates – instruments (4)

Technical

- Lee Kyeong-won – digital editing (1–3, 5, 7–8)
- Bang Chan (3Racha) – digital editing (1–2, 4, 8), recording (2–5, 7–8)
- Restart – digital editing (3)
- Goo Hye-jin – recording (all)
- Lim Chan-mi – recording (3)
- Yoon Won-kwon – mixing (1, 3, 5, 7)
- Manny Marroquin – mixing (2), mixing in Dolby Atmos (2)
- Space Primates – mixing (4)
- Stay Tuned – mixing (6)
- Shin Bong-won – mixing in Dolby Atmos (1, 3–8)
  - Park Nam-joon – assistant
- Chris Galland – mix engineering (2)
  - Ramiro Fernandez-Seoane – assistant
- Kevin Madigan – mix engineering in Dolby Atmos (2)
  - Anthony Vilchis – assistant
  - Trey Station – assistant
- DallasK – remixing (8)
- Dave Kutch – mastering (all)

Locations

- JYPE Studios – recording (all)
- Channie's "Room" – recording (2–5, 7–8)
- MadMiix – mixing (1, 3, 5, 7)
- Larrabee Studios – mixing (2), mixing in Dolby Atmos (2)
- Stay Tuned Studio – mixing (6)
- The Mastering Palace – mastering (all)
- GLAB Studios – Dolby Atmos mixing (all)

== Charts ==
=== Weekly charts ===
Weekly chart performance for Ate
| Chart (2024) | Peak position |
|---|---|
| Australian Albums (ARIA) | 2 |
| Austrian Albums (Ö3 Austria) | 1 |
| Belgian Albums (Ultratop Flanders) | 1 |
| Belgian Albums (Ultratop Wallonia) | 1 |
| Canadian Albums (Billboard) | 21 |
| Croatian International Albums (HDU) | 1 |
| Czech Albums (ČNS IFPI) | 92 |
| Danish Albums (Hitlisten) | 6 |
| Dutch Albums (Album Top 100) | 7 |
| Finnish Albums (Suomen virallinen lista) | 9 |
| French Albums (SNEP) | 1 |
| German Albums (Offizielle Top 100) | 2 |
| Greek Albums (IFPI) | 1 |
| Hungarian Albums (MAHASZ) | 1 |
| Icelandic Albums (Tónlistinn) | 17 |
| Italian Albums (FIMI) | 6 |
| Japanese Albums (Oricon) | 2 |
| Japanese Combined Albums (Oricon) | 2 |
| Japanese Hot Albums (Billboard Japan) | 5 |
| Lithuanian Albums (AGATA) | 6 |
| New Zealand Albums (RMNZ) | 9 |
| Polish Albums (ZPAV) | 1 |
| Portuguese Albums (AFP) | 1 |
| South Korean Albums (Circle) | 1 |
| Slovak Albums (IFPI) | 60 |
| Spanish Albums (Promusicae) | 6 |
| Swedish Albums (Sverigetopplistan) | 12 |
| Swiss Albums (Schweizer Hitparade) | 2 |
| UK Albums (Official Charts) | 62 |
| US Billboard 200 | 1 |
| US World Albums (Billboard) | 1 |

=== Monthly charts ===
Monthly chart performance for Ate
| Chart (2024) | Position |
|---|---|
| Japanese Albums (Oricon) | 4 |
| South Korean Albums (Circle) | 1 |

=== Year-end charts ===
2024 year-end chart performance for Ate
| Chart (2024) | Position |
|---|---|
| Austrian Albums (Ö3 Austria) | 34 |
| Belgian Albums (Ultratop Flanders) | 76 |
| Belgian Albums (Ultratop Wallonia) | 143 |
| French Albums (SNEP) | 65 |
| Croatian International Albums (HDU) | 13 |
| German Albums (Offizielle Top 100) | 88 |
| Global Albums (IFPI) | 10 |
| Hungarian Albums (MAHASZ) | 26 |
| Japanese Albums (Oricon) | 15 |
| Japanese Download Albums (Billboard Japan) | 37 |
| Polish Albums (ZPAV) | 60 |
| Portuguese Albums (AFP) | 45 |
| South Korean Albums (Circle) | 3 |
| Swiss Albums (Schweizer Hitparade) | 75 |
| US Billboard 200 | 139 |
| US World Albums (Billboard) | 2 |

2025 year-end chart performance for Ate
| Chart (2025) | Position |
|---|---|
| US World Albums (Billboard) | 11 |

== Certifications and sales ==
Certifications and sales for Ate
| Region | Certification | Certified units/sales |
|---|---|---|
| France (SNEP) | Gold | 50,000^{‡} |
| South Korea (KMCA) | 3× Million | 3,000,000^{^} |
| United States (RIAA) | Gold | 500,000^{‡} |
Summaries
| Worldwide (IFPI) | — | 2,900,000 |
^{^} Shipments figures based on certification alone.^{‡} Sales+streaming figures based on certification alone.

== Release history ==
Release dates and formats for Ate
| Region | Date | Format | Version | Label | Ref. |
|---|---|---|---|---|---|
| Various | July 19, 2024 | CD; digital download; streaming | Limited; standard | JYP; Republic | |
| South Korea | July 19, 2024 | Nemo | Nemo | JYP; Republic | |
| United States | July 23, 2024 | Digital download | Exclusive digital | JYP; Republic | |

== See also ==
- List of Billboard 200 number-one albums of 2024
- List of Circle Album Chart number ones of 2024
- List of number-one albums of 2024 (Belgium)
- List of number-one albums of 2024 (Poland)
- List of number-one albums of 2024 (Portugal)
- List of number-one hits of 2024 (Austria)
- List of number-one hits of 2024 (France)
