= Social Path =

Single by Stray Kids featuring Lisa

from the EP Social Path / Super Bowl (Japanese Ver.)
- Language: English; Japanese
- A-side: "Super Bowl" (Japanese ver.)
- Released: August 30, 2023
- Studio: JYPE (Seoul)
- Genre: Rock
- Length: 3:19
- Label: Epic Japan
- Composers: Bang Chan; Changbin; Han; Versachoi
- Lyricists: Bang Chan; Changbin; Han; Yohei

Stray Kids singles chronology
"Super Bowl" (Japanese ver.) (2023)	"Social Path" (2023)	"Lalalala" (2023)

Lisa singles chronology
"Realize" (2023)	"Social Path" (2023)	"Hello World" (2024)

Music video
- "Social Path" on YouTube

"Social Path" is a song by South Korean boy band Stray Kids, featuring Japanese singer-songwriter Lisa. It was released on August 30, 2023, through Epic Records Japan, as the second single from their third Japanese-language EP Social Path / Super Bowl (Japanese Ver.).

== Background and composition ==
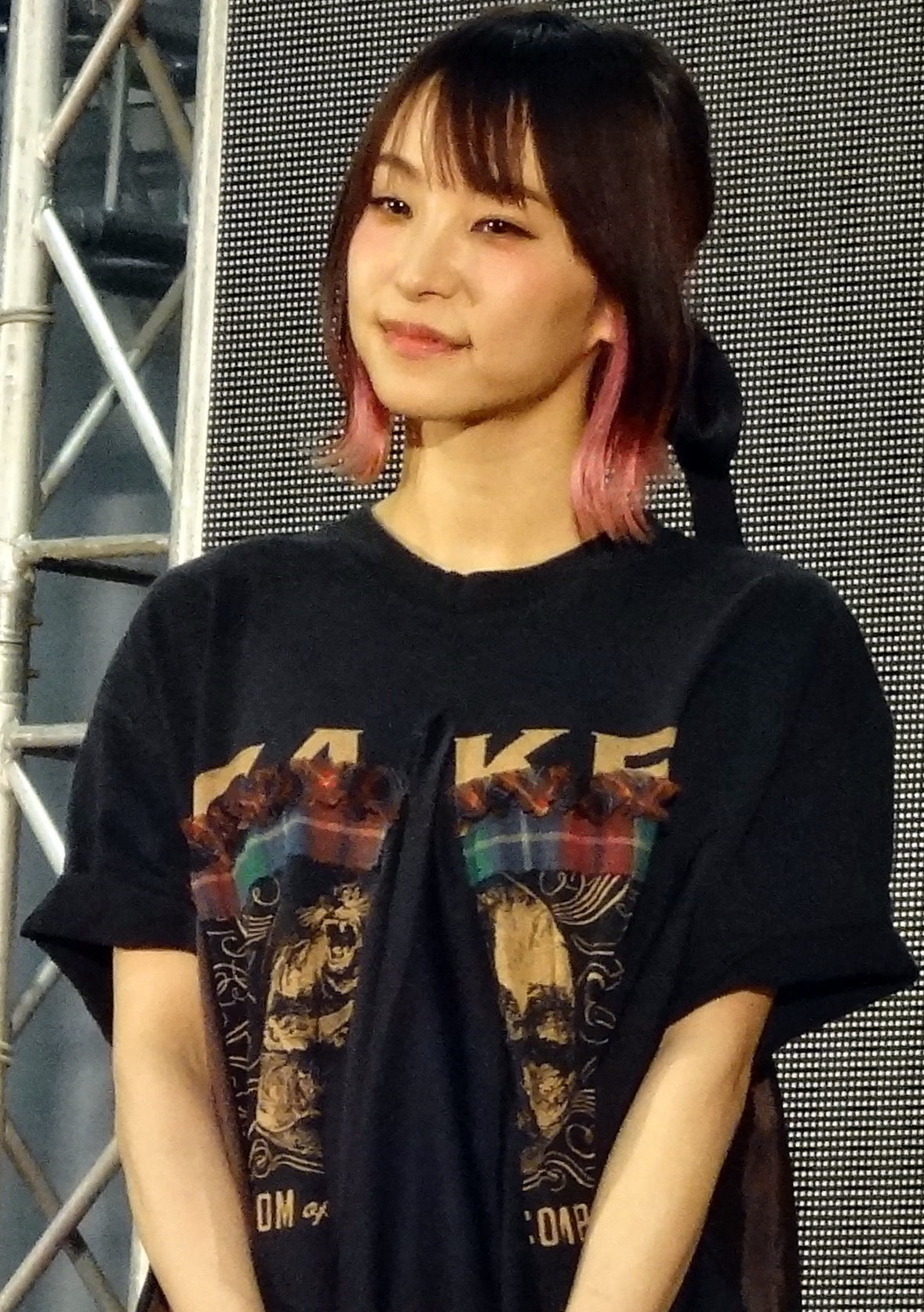
Japanese singer-songwriter Lisa features on "Social Path".

On June 26, 2023, Stray Kids announced their first Japanese-language extended play, set to be released on September 6. (Note: Social Path (Feat. Lisa) / Super Bowl (Japanese Ver.) has been marketed as the group's "Japan first EP", despite having two previous All In (2020), and Circus (2022), which were officially classified as "mini-album".) The EP's title Social Path / Super Bowl (Japanese Ver.), and its track listing were revealed on July 27, confirming the dual lead single "Social Path", featuring Japanese singer-songwriter Lisa, and the Japanese version of "Super Bowl". The song was described as a rock track, expressing both artists' experiences in a music career and strong belief and determination. The song was released on August 30, one week before the EP release. The Korean version was included on the group's eighth Korean-language EP Rock-Star.

== Music video ==
An accompanying music video for "Social Path" premiered on August 30, 2023, the same day as the single release. Directed by Novvkim and filmed in Seoul, South Korea, the visual features Stray Kids members enduring a storm and a crowd of people wearing paper masks, while Lisa sings on the aerial stage.

== Live performances ==
Stray Kids gave the debut performance of "Social Path" on August 16 at Fukuoka show of their 5-Star Dome Tour. The group and Lisa performed the song together at the television special Venue 101 Presents Stray Kids 5-Star Live on September 23, and Music Station Super Live 2023 on December 22, alongside "S-Class". Lisa solely performed "Social Path" at the Seoul concert of her Lisa Live Is Smile Always Asia Tour on July 20, 2024.

== Usage in media ==
"Social Path" was selected to be the theme for Abema's sports program Abema Sports Time in October 2023.

== Accolades ==
Awards and nominations for "Social Path"
Ceremony	Year	Award	Result	Ref.
Asian Pop Music Awards	2023	Best Collaboration	Nominated	

== Credits and personnel ==
Personnel

- Stray Kids – vocals, background vocals
  - Bang Chan (3Racha) – lyrics, composition, vocal directing
  - Changbin (3Racha) – lyrics, composition
  - Han (3Racha) – lyrics, composition
- Lisa – featured vocals
- Versachoi – composition, arrangement, all instruments, computer programming, synthesizer, keyboard, vocal directing
- Nickko Young – guitar
- Lee Kyeong-won – digital editing
- Goo Hye-jin – recording
- Curtis Douglas – mixing
- Chris Gehringer – mastering

Locations

- Sony Music Entertainment (Japan) Inc. – publishing (Japanese/original version)
- JYP Publishing (KOMCA) – publishing
- JYPE Studios – recording
- Sterling Sound – mastering

== Charts ==
Chart performance for "Social Path"
Chart (2023)	Peak position
Japan (Japan Hot 100)	27
Japan Combined Singles (Oricon)	27
New Zealand Hot Singles (RMNZ)	29
South Korea Download (Circle) Korean version	23

== Release history ==
Release dates and formats for "Social Path"
Region	Date	Format	Label	Ref.
Various	August 30, 2023	Digital download; streaming	Epic Japan	
