= 5-Star Dome Tour =

2023 concert tour by Stray Kids

- Dome tour by Stray Kids
- Promotional poster
- Location: South Korea; Japan
- Associated albums: 5-Star; Social Path / Super Bowl (Japanese Ver.)
- Start date: August 16, 2023
- End date: October 29, 2023
- Legs: 1
- No. of shows: 10

Stray Kids concert chronology
- Maniac World Tour (2022–2023); 5-Star Dome Tour (2023); Dominate World Tour (2024–2025)

The 5-Star Dome Tour was the first all-dome tour and third overall concert tour by South Korean boy band Stray Kids in support of their third studio album 5-Star and their third Japanese-language EP Social Path / Super Bowl (Japanese Ver.). It began in Fukuoka on August 16, 2023, and concluded in Tokyo on October 29, 2023. The tour received 341,000 attendees in Japan.

== Background and ticketing ==
On New Year's Day in 2023, the group uploaded the video "Step Out 2023" to their social media, outlining their accomplishments in 2022 and plans for the new year, including a "special concert". On June 12, 2023, Stray Kids announced their all-dome concert tour, titled 5-Star Dome Tour 2023, in support of the group's third studio album 5-Star. The tour was started on August 16 at PayPay Dome, Fukuoka, Japan, and concluded on October 29 at Tokyo Dome, Tokyo.

The five shows at Nagoya, Osaka, and Tokyo broadcast at movie theaters in Japan through Live Viewing Japan, as well as pay-per-view livestream for September 3 and 10 shows. The tickets were sold out immediately within 5 minutes for general sales, and more than 2.5 million tickets have been applied for. The two Seoul shows were rescheduled from September 30 – October 1 to October 21–22, taking place at Gocheok Sky Dome, subtitled "Seoul Special (Unveil 13)", which tickets were also sold out. The video album for the concert at Tokyo Dome was released on September 18.

== Set list ==
Set list in Japan
1. "Battle Ground"
2. "Freeze"
3. "Item"
4. "Case 143" (Japanese version)
5. "God's Menu" (Japanese version)
6. "All In"
7. "Wolfgang"
8. "Miroh" (Kingdom version)
9. "Rev It Up" (Felix solo)
10. "Don't Say" (Han solo)
11. "Perfume" (Seungmin solo)
12. "Hug Me" (I.N solo)
13. "Limbo" (Lee Know solo)
14. "Baby" (Bang Chan solo)
15. "Mic&Brush" (Hyunjin solo)
16. "My Name" (Changbin solo)
17. "Circus"
18. "Topline"
19. "S-Class"
20. "Chill" (Japanese version)
21. "Slump" (Japanese version)
22. "Super Board"
23. "My Pace" (Japanese version)
24. "Question"
25. "Social Path"
26. "Super Bowl" (Japanese version) (Fukuoka, Nagoya and Osaka) / "Megaverse" (Tokyo)
27. "Hall of Fame"

Encore

28. "Astronaut"
29. "Star Lost" (Nagoya, Osaka and Tokyo)
30. "Fairytale"
31. "Fam"
32. "Haven"
33. "Miroh" (Tokyo)
Set list in South Korea
1. "Battle Ground" (Korean version)
2. "Freeze"
3. "Item"
4. "Case 143"
5. "God's Menu"
6. "All In" (Korean version)
7. "Wolfgang"
8. "Miroh" (Kingdom version)
9. "Rev It Up" (Felix solo)
10. "Don't Say" (Han solo)
11. "Perfume" (Seungmin solo)
12. "Hug Me" (I.N solo)
13. "Limbo" (Lee Know solo)
14. "Baby" (Bang Chan solo)
15. "Mic&Brush" (Hyunjin solo)
16. "My Name" (Changbin solo)
17. "Circus" (Korean version)
18. "Topline"
19. "S-Class"
20. "Chill"
21. "Slump"
22. "Social Path" (Korean version)
23. "Leave"
24. "Blind Spot"
25. "Megaverse"
26. "Super Bowl"
27. "Hall of Fame"

Encore

28. "Astronaut"
29. "Star Lost"
30. "DLC"
31. "My Pace"
32. "Haven"
33. "Miroh" (day 2)

== Shows ==
Tour dates
Date (2023)	City	Country	Venue	Attendance
August 16	Fukuoka	Japan	PayPay Dome	75,000
August 17	Fukuoka	Japan	PayPay Dome	75,000
September 2	Nagoya	Japan	Vantelin Dome	76,000
September 3	Nagoya	Japan	Vantelin Dome	76,000
September 9	Osaka	Japan	Kyocera Dome	90,000
September 10	Osaka	Japan	Kyocera Dome	90,000
October 21	Seoul	South Korea	Gocheok Sky Dome	—
October 22	Seoul	South Korea	Gocheok Sky Dome	—
October 28	Tokyo	Japan	Tokyo Dome	100,000
October 29	Tokyo	Japan	Tokyo Dome	100,000
Total				344,000
