= Super Bowl (song) =

2023 single by Stray Kids

Song by Stray Kids

from the album 5-Star
- Language: English
- Released: June 2, 2023
- Studio: JYPE (Seoul)
- Genre: Techno
- Length: 3:03
- Label: JYP; Republic
- Composers: Bang Chan; Changbin; Han; Zack Djurich
- Lyricists: Bang Chan; Changbin; Han; Felix

"Super Bowl" (Japanese ver.)

Single by Stray Kids

from the EP Social Path / Super Bowl (Japanese Ver.)
- Language: Japanese; English
- A-side: "Social Path"
- Released: August 10, 2023
- Studio: JYPE (Seoul)
- Genre: Techno
- Length: 3:05
- Label: Epic Japan
- Composers: Bang Chan; Changbin; Han; Zack Djurich
- Lyricists: Bang Chan; Changbin; Han; Felix; KM-Markit

Stray Kids singles chronology
"S-Class" (2023)	"Super Bowl" (Japanese ver.) (2023)	"Social Path" (2023)

Music video
- "Super Bowl" (Japanese ver.) on YouTube

"Super Bowl" is a song by South Korean boy band Stray Kids, taken from their third Korean-language studio album 5-Star, which was released on June 2, 2023, through JYP Entertainment and Republic Records. The Japanese version was released as the lead single from their third Japanese-language EP Social Path / Super Bowl (Japanese Ver.) on August 10, 2023, through Epic Records Japan.

== Background and release ==
Originally titled "God's Menu", "Super Bowl" was written at the same time as "God's Menu"—both depict the cooking concept—and become one of the candidates for the lead single of Stray Kids' first studio album Go Live (2020), which they eventually chose "God's Menu". Three years later, on April 28, 2023, The group's third Korean-language studio album 5-Star was announced via a trailer, set to be released on June 2. The album's Solar System-styled track listing was posted two days later. Out of 12 songs, "Super Bowl" appears as the fourth track. The title "Super Bowl" referred to the American football championship game of the same name.

On June 26, 2023, the group announced their first Japanese-language extended play, set to be released on September 6. (Note: Social Path / Super Bowl (Japanese Ver.) has been marketed as the group's "Japan first EP", despite having two previous All In (2020), and Circus (2022), which were officially classified as "mini-album".) The EP's title Social Path / Super Bowl (Japanese Ver.), and track listing were revealed on July 27, confirming the Japanese version of "Super Bowl" as the lead single, alongside "Social Path" featuring Japanese singer-songwriter Lisa. The song was released on August 10.

== Composition ==
"Super Bowl" is a techno track, written by 3Racha—an in-house production team of Stray Kids members Bang Chan, Changbin, and Han—and co-written lyrics by bandmate Felix and co-composed by Zack Djurich. The song compares Stray Kids' music to dishes of food, including whispering in a manner similar to ASMR.

== Music video ==
An accompanying music video for the Japanese version of "Super Bowl" premiered on August 10, 2023, in conjunction with the single release. It was directed Jeong Nu-ri. In the visual, Stray Kids portray waiters and American football players, along with their team mascot called "Skichu". A part of the music video referred to Gordon Ramsay's meme "Idiot Sandwich".

== Live performances ==
Stray Kids first performed "Super Bowl" at Lollapalooza music festival in Paris on July 21, 2023. The Japanese version was included on the setlist of their 5-Star Dome Tour.

== Credits and personnel ==
Personnel

- Stray Kids – vocals, background vocals
  - Bang Chan (3Racha) – lyrics, composition, arrangement, all instruments, computer programming
  - Changbin (3Racha) – lyrics, composition
  - Han (3Racha) – lyrics, composition
  - Felix – lyrics
- KM-Markit – Japanese lyrics
- Zack Djurich – composition, arrangement, all instruments, computer programming
- Lee Kyeong-won – digital editing
- Lim Chan-mi – recording
- Goo Hye-jin – recording (Japanese version)
- Yoon Won-kwon – mixing
- Kwon Nam-woo – mastering

Locations

- JYP Publishing (KOMCA) – original publishing, sub-publishing
- Copyright Control – original publishing, sub-publishing
- Sony Music Entertainment (Japan) Inc. – publishing (Japanese version)
- JYPE Studios – recording
- Studio DDeepKick – mixing
- 821 Sound Mastering – mastering

== Charts ==
=== Weekly charts ===
Weekly chart performance for "Super Bowl"
Chart (2023)	Peak position
New Zealand Hot Singles (RMNZ)	24
South Korea Download (Circle)	21
US World Digital Song Sales (Billboard)	13

Weekly chart performance for "Super Bowl" (Japanese ver.)
Chart (2023)	Peak position
Japan Hot 100 (Billboard)	56
Japan Digital Singles (Oricon)	42
Japan Streaming (Oricon)	43

=== Monthly charts ===
Monthly chart performance for "Super Bowl"
Chart (2023)	Position
South Korea Download (Circle)	51

== Release history ==
Release dates and formats for "Super Bowl"
Region	Date	Format	Version	Label	Ref.
Various	August 10, 2023	Digital download; streaming	Japanese	Epic Japan	
