= List of Music Bank Chart winners (2023) =

Music Bank Chart winners (2023)

Highlights
- Song with most wins: "Crazy Form" by Ateez (3)
- Artist(s) with most wins: Ateez (6)
- Song with highest score: "God of Music" by Seventeen (16,281)

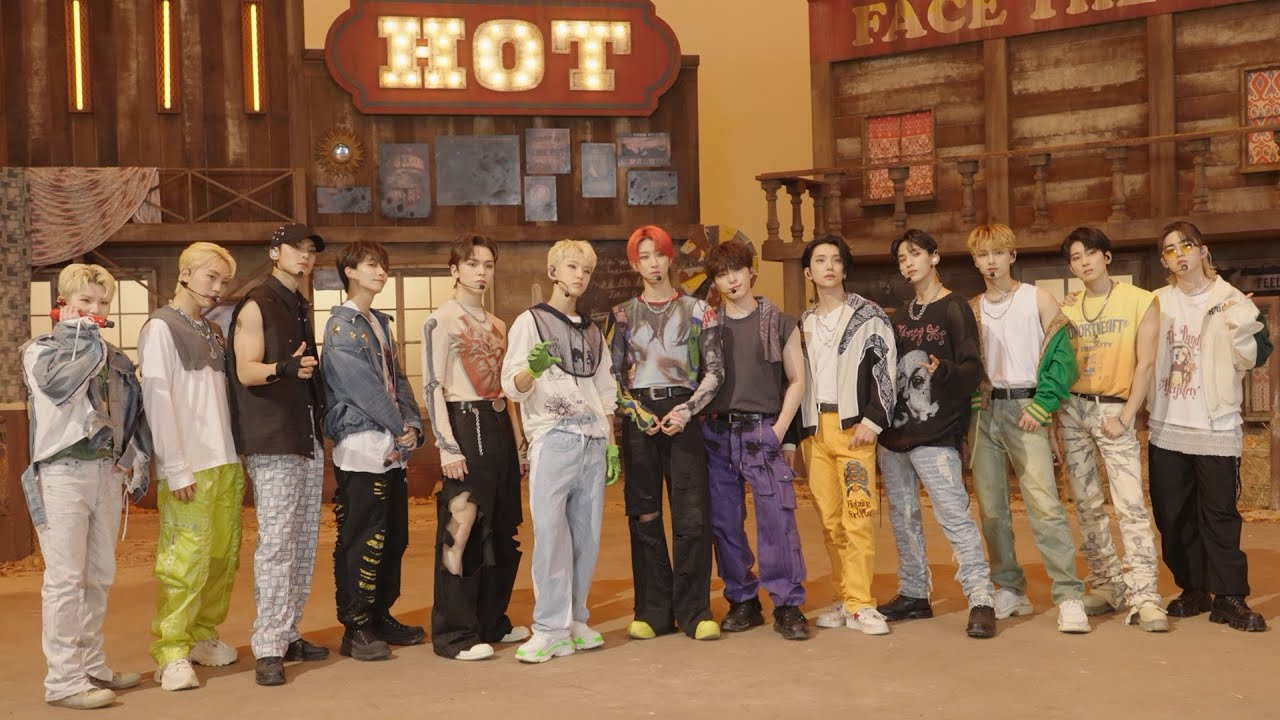
Seventeen's (pictured) win for "God of Music" had the highest score of 2023, with 16,281 points on the November 3 broadcast.

The Music Bank Chart is a record chart established in 1998 on the South Korean KBS television music program Music Bank. Every week during its live broadcast, the show gives an award for the best-performing single on the South Korean chart. Since the episode on January 6, 2024, the chart utilizes digital performances on domestic online music services (60%), number of times the single was broadcast on KBS TV, radio and digital channels (20%), global pre-vote derived from the Mubeat app (10%), album sales (5%), and a social media score calculated using YouTube and TikTok data gathered from the Circle chart (5%) in its ranking methodology. The score for domestic online music services is calculated using data from Melon, Bugs, Genie Music, Naver Vibe and Flo.

Actor Lee Chae-min and Ive member Jang Won-young had been hosting the show together since September 30, 2022. Nmixx member Haewon appeared as a guest host on the first broadcast of the year in lieu of Won-young. Won-young went on to leave the show on January 13, 2023, after hosting the show for 1 year and 4 months. For the next three weeks NewJeans member Minji and Oh My Girl member Mimi appeared as guest hosts alongside Chae-min. Le Sserafim's Hong Eun-chae was announced as the new co-host of the show on February 10, 2023. Since then, Dahyun, NewJeans' Hanni, Arin, Kim Se-jeong, TXT's Choi Soo-bin, and Umji have appeared as guest hosts in lieu of Eun-chae.

In 2023, 42 singles achieved number one on the chart, and 30 acts were awarded first-place trophies. "God of Music" by Seventeen had the highest score of the year, with 16,281 points on the November 3 broadcast. Ateez's "Crazy Form" won three trophies, making it the most awarded song of the year. Ateez had three number-one singles on the chart in 2023 achieved with "Halazia", "Bouncy (K-Hot Chilli Peppers)", and "Crazy Form". The three songs spent a total of six weeks atop the chart, making Ateez the act with the most wins of the year. Boy group The Boyz also had three number-one singles on the chart achieved with "Roar", "Lip Gloss", and "Watch It". In addition to Ateez and The Boyz, eight other acts had more than one single ranked number one on the chart in 2023. Girl groups NewJeans and STAYC had two number-one singles on the chart achieved with "Ditto" and OMG", and "Teddy Bear" and "Bubble", respectively. Six boy groups ranked two singles at number one on the chart in 2023: TXT with "Sugar Rush Ride" and "Chasing That Feeling", NCT 127 with "Ay-yo" and "Fact Check", Seventeen with "Super" and "God of Music", Enhypen with "Bite Me" and "Sweet Venom", Stray Kids with "S-Class" and "Lalalala", and Exo with "Cream Soda" and "The First Snow".

Ten acts achieved their first number one on Music Bank in 2023. "Rover", "Killin' Me Good", and "Perfume" helped solo artists Kai and Jihyo and boy group NCT DoJaeJung gain their first ever music show awards on the March 24, August 25 and September 29 broadcasts, respectively. BSS and Tempest achieved their first number ones on the chart with "Fighting" and "Vroom Vroom", respectively. BTS members Jimin, V, and Jungkook gained their first solo number ones on the chart with "Like Crazy", "Slow Dancing", and "Seven", respectively. The former two went on to rank number one for two weeks on the chart. Blackpink's Jisoo achieved her first number one on Music Bank on the April 14 broadcast with "Flower".

== Chart history ==
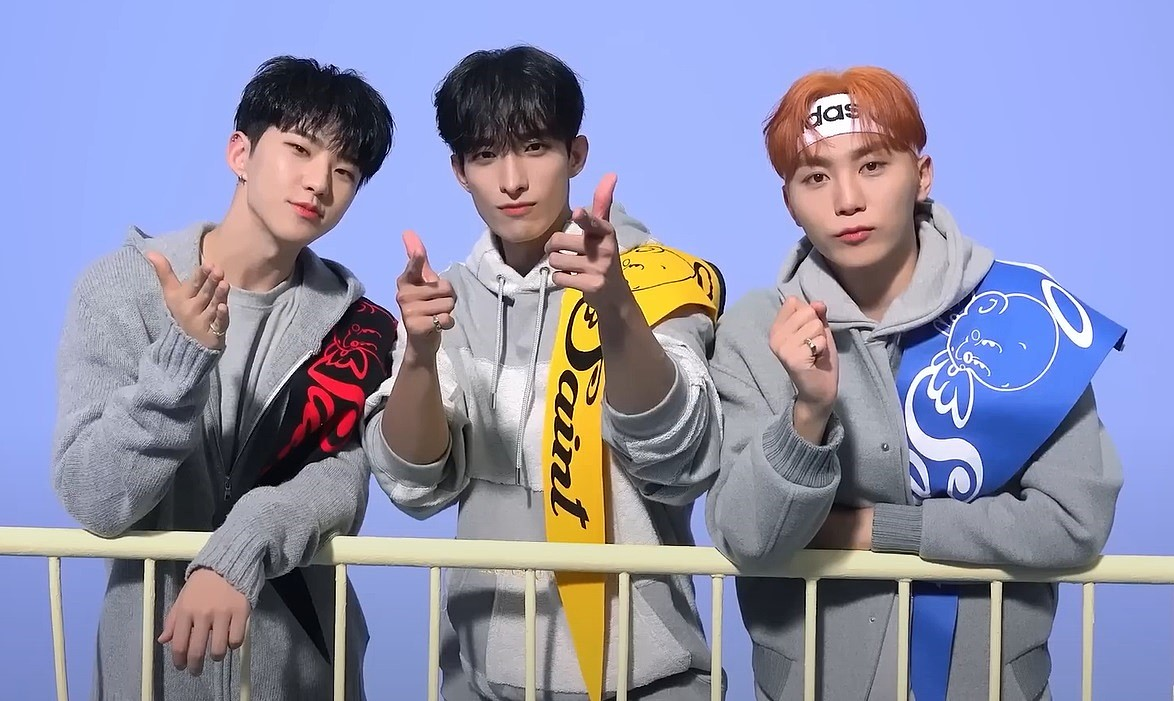
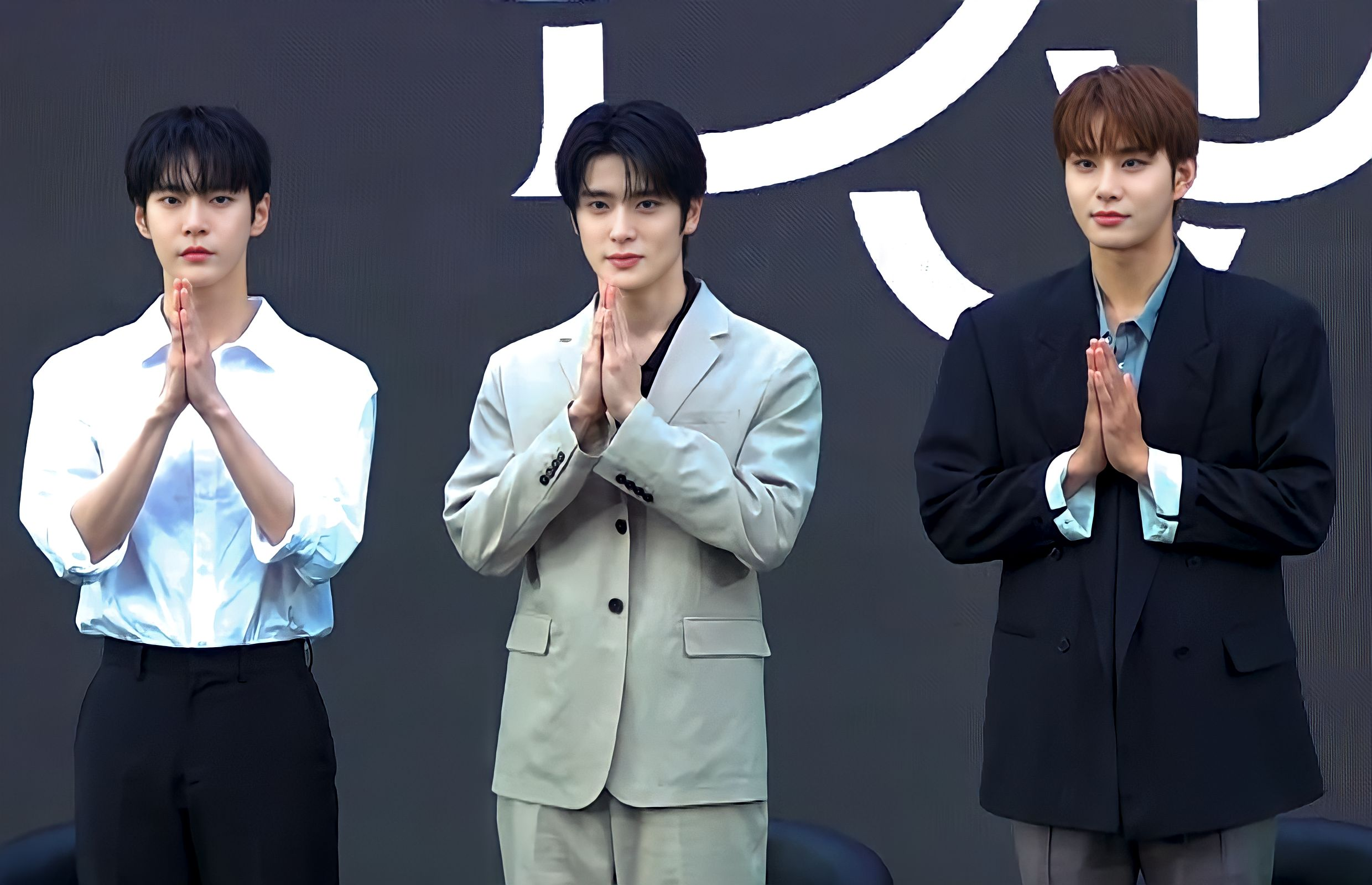
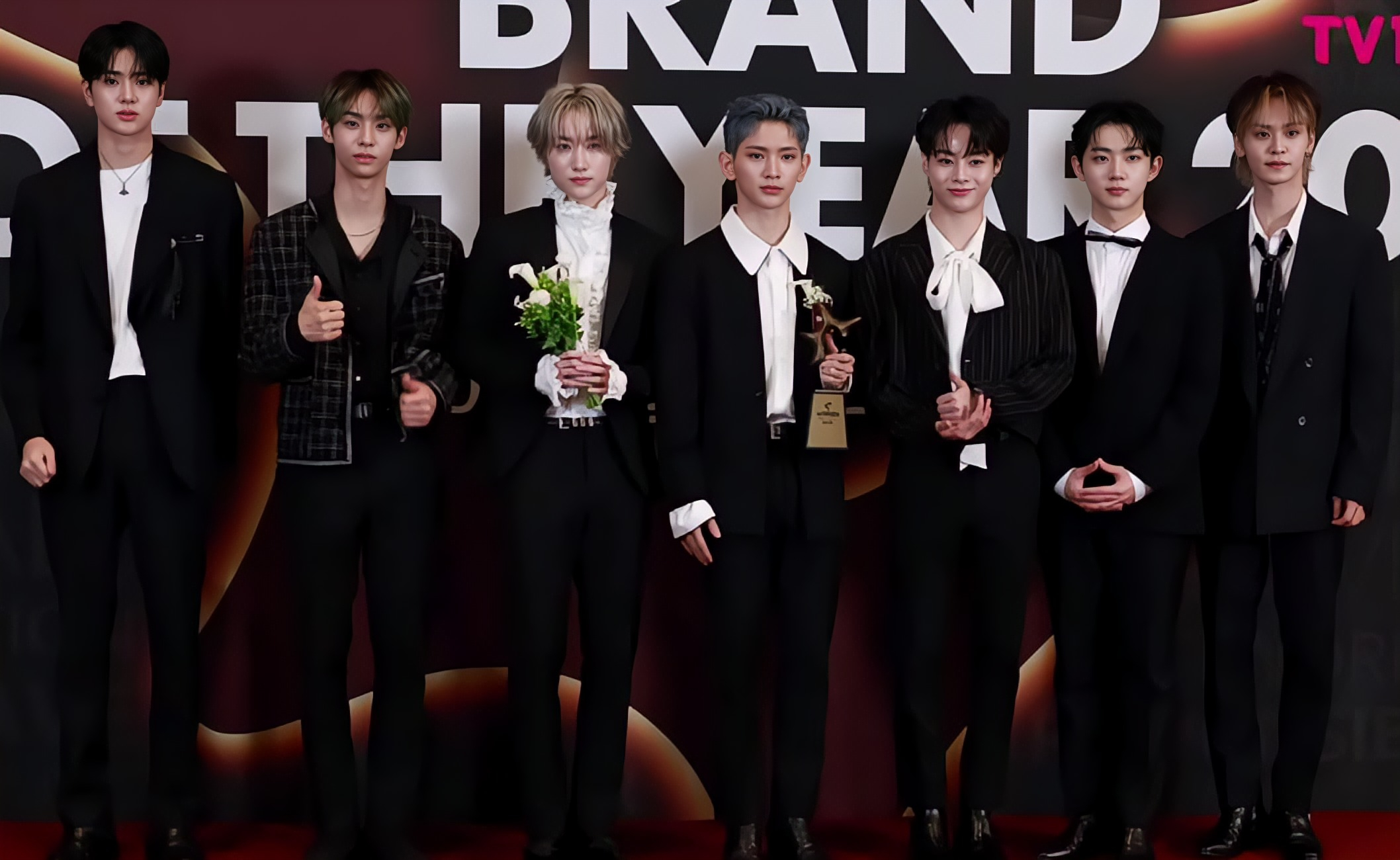
BSS (top), NCT DoJaeJung (middle) and Tempest (bottom) received their first major broadcast music show wins with their Music Bank trophies for "Fighting", "Perfume" and "Vroom Vroom", respectively.
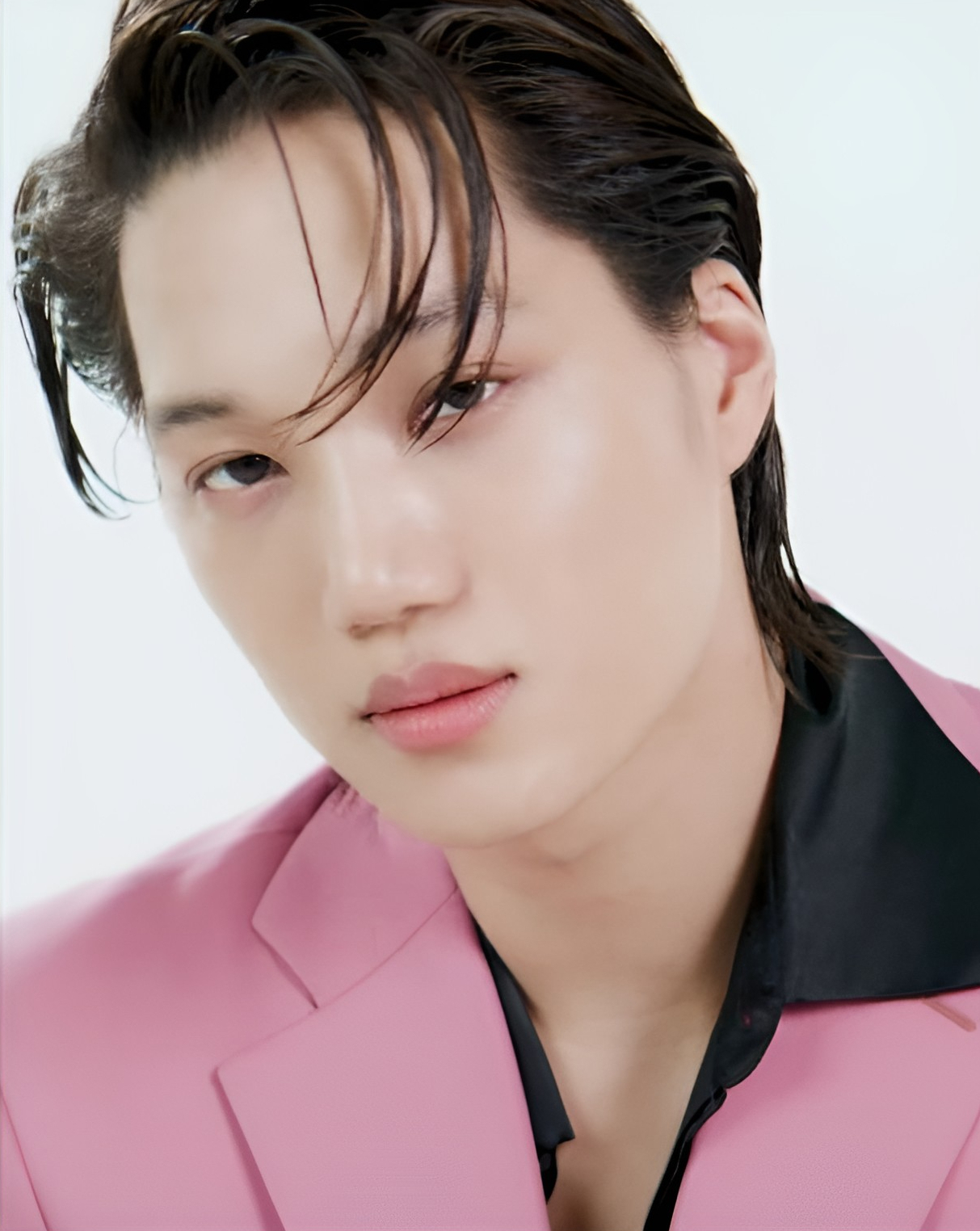
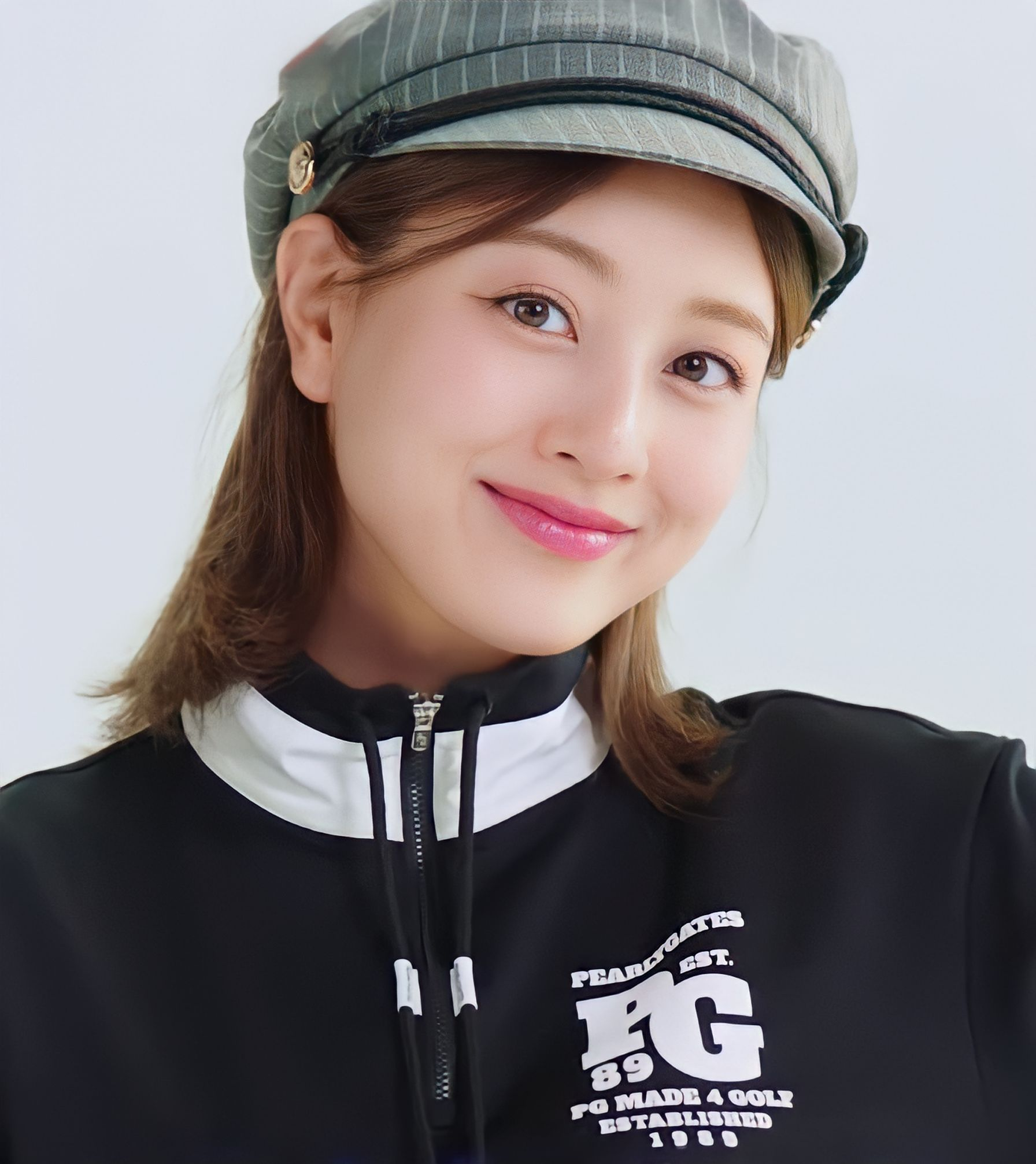
Exo's Kai and Twice's Jihyo received their first ever music show award trophies at Music Bank as solo artists with "Rover", and "Killin' Me Good", respectively.
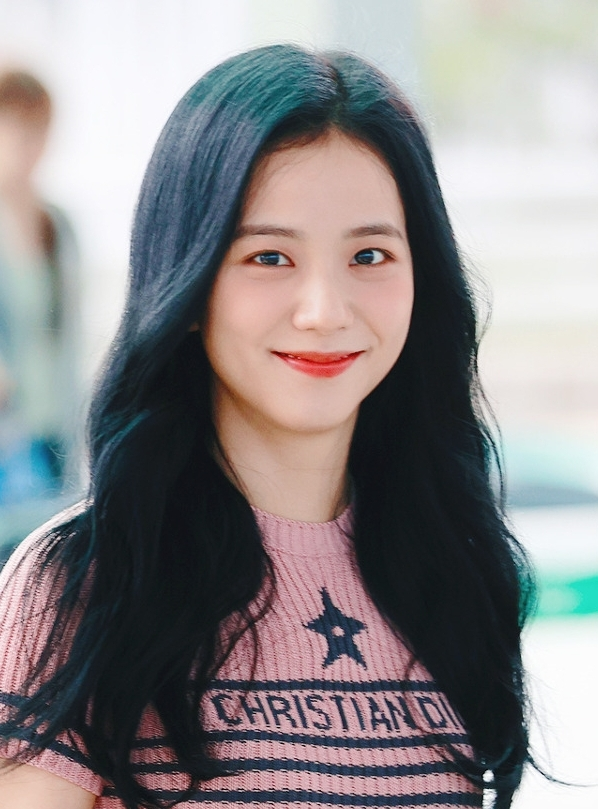
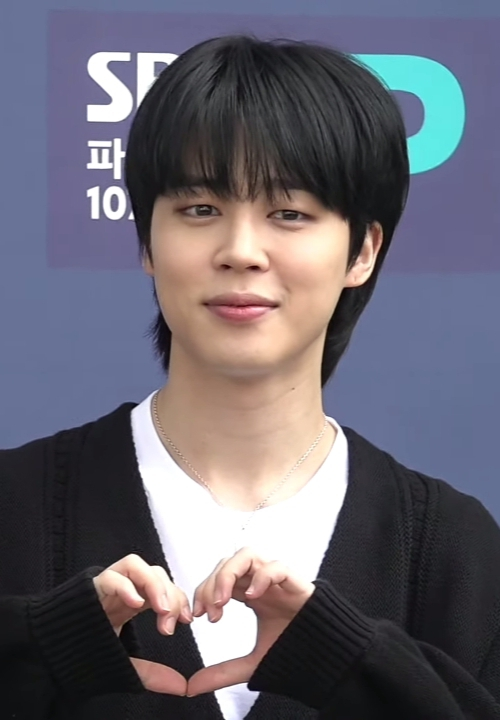
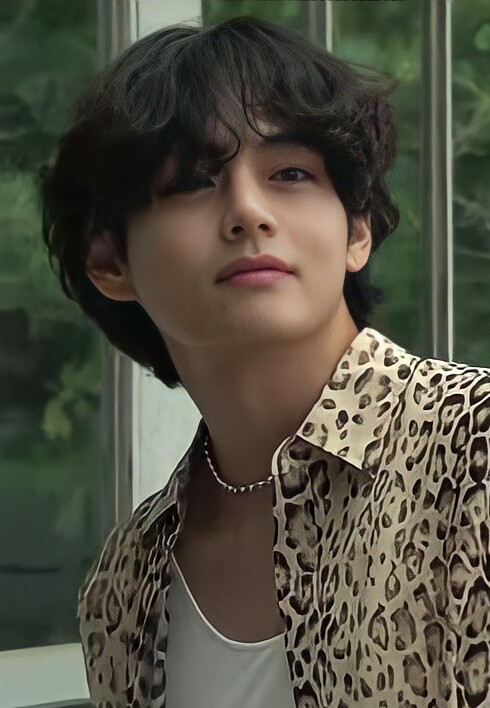
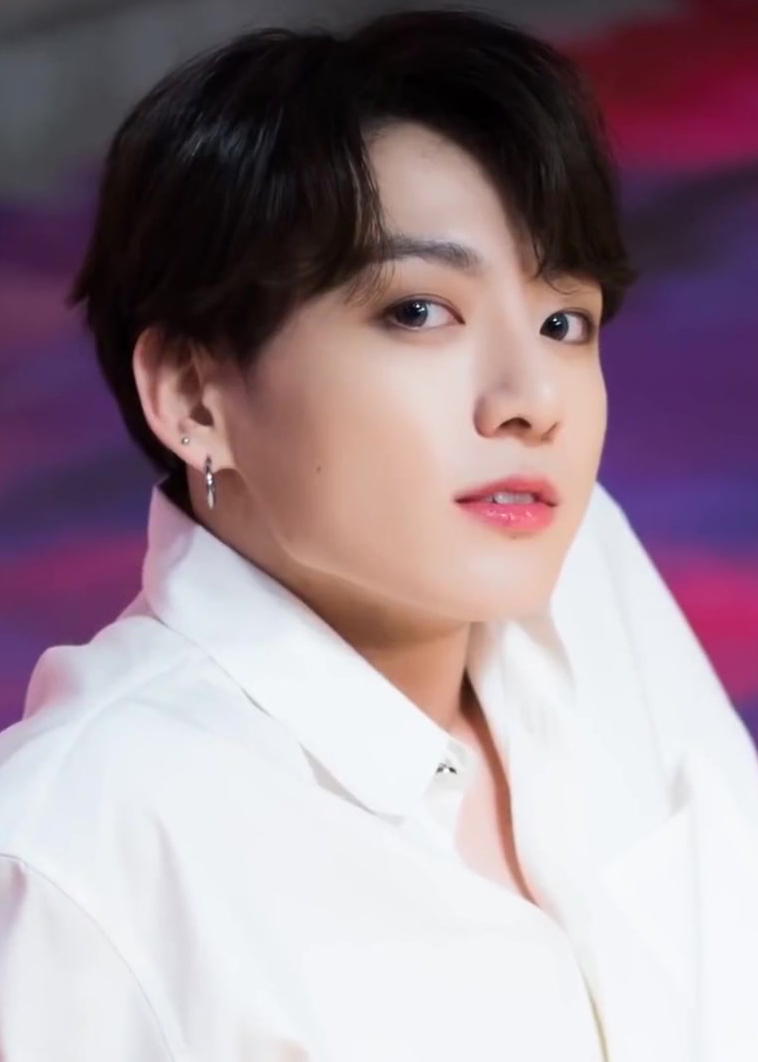
Blackpink's Jisoo (top left), BTS' Jimin (top right), V (bottom left) and Jungkook (bottom right) received their first Music Bank trophies as solo artists with "Flower", "Like Crazy", "Slow Dancing" and "Seven - Clean Ver.", respectively.

Key
‡	Highest score in 2023
—	No show was broadcast

Chart history
Episode	Date	Artist	Song	Points	Ref.
1,146	January 6	Ateez	"Halazia"	8,793	
1,147	January 13	NewJeans	"Ditto"	11,011	
1,148	January 20	Monsta X	"Beautiful Liar"	10,600	
1,149	January 27	NewJeans	"OMG"	7,612	
1,150	February 3	TXT	"Sugar Rush Ride"	13,245	
1,151	February 10	NCT 127	"Ay-Yo"	11,861	
1,152	February 17	BSS	"Fighting"	8,828	
1,153	February 24	STAYC	"Teddy Bear"	7,566	
1,154	March 3	The Boyz	"Roar"	8,514	
— (Note: This week's winners were announced on the station's official website.)	March 10	The Boyz	"Roar"	6,013	
1,155	March 17	Twice	"Set Me Free"	12,587	
1,156	March 24	Kai	"Rover"	8,161	
1,157	March 31	Jimin	"Like Crazy"	9,198	
1,158	April 7	Jimin	"Like Crazy"	7,682	
1,159	April 14	Jisoo	"Flower"	7,140	
1,160	April 21	Ive	"I Am"	14,690	
1,161	April 28	NCT DoJaeJung	"Perfume"	8,350	
1,162	May 5	Seventeen	"Super"	13,059	
1,163	May 12	Le Sserafim	"Unforgiven"	13,498	
1,164	May 19	Aespa	"Spicy"	11,842	
1,165	May 26	(G)I-dle	"Queencard"	10,487	
1,166	June 2	Enhypen	"Bite Me"	12,595	
1,167	June 9	Stray Kids	"S-Class"	13,481	
1,168	June 16	Stray Kids	"S-Class"	8,333	
1,169	June 23	Ateez	"Bouncy (K-Hot Chilli Peppers)"	11,624	
1,170	June 30	Ateez	"Bouncy (K-Hot Chilli Peppers)"	7,410	
1,171	July 7	Shinee	"Hard"	6,453	
1,172	July 14	(G)I-dle	"Queencard"	5,154	
1,173	July 21	Exo	"Cream Soda"	7,269	
1,174	July 28	NCT Dream	"ISTJ"	11,841	
1,175	August 4	NCT Dream	"ISTJ"	6,841	
—	August 11	Itzy	"Cake"	10,866	
1,176	August 18	The Boyz	"Lip Gloss"	7,306	
1,177	August 25	Jihyo	"Killin' Me Good"	5,525	
1,178	September 1	STAYC	"Bubble"	5,928	
1,179	September 8	NCT U	"Baggy Jeans"	11,881	
1,180	September 15	V	"Slow Dancing"	9,234	
1,181	September 22	V	"Slow Dancing"	6,587	
—	September 29	Tempest	"Vroom Vroom"	5,914	
—	October 6	Oneus	"Baila Conmigo"	5,408	
1,182	October 13	NCT 127	"Fact Check"	8,896	
—	October 20	TXT	"Chasing That Feeling"	8,897	
1,183	October 27	TXT	"Chasing That Feeling"	5,906	
1,184	November 3	Seventeen	"God of Music"	16,281 ‡	
1,185	November 10	Jungkook	"Seven"	9,776	
1,186	November 17	Stray Kids	"Lalalala"	10,481	
1,187	November 24	Enhypen	"Sweet Venom"	11,542	
1,188	December 1	The Boyz	"Watch It"	7,511	
—	December 8	Ateez	"Crazy Form"	10,386	
—	December 15	Ateez	"Crazy Form"	6,348	
—	December 22	Ateez	"Crazy Form"	5,411	
—	December 29	Exo	"The First Snow"	4,543	

== See also ==
- List of Inkigayo Chart winners (2023)
- List of M Countdown Chart winners (2023)
- List of Show Champion Chart winners (2023)
- List of Show! Music Core Chart winners (2023)
- List of The Show Chart winners (2023)
