= Bubble (STAYC song) =

Single by STAYC

from the EP Teenfresh
- Language: Korean
- Released: August 16, 2023
- Length: 2:59
- Label: High Up; Kakao
- Composers: B.E.P; Flyt
- Lyricists: B.E.P; Jeon Goon

STAYC singles chronology
"Teddy Bear" (2023)	"Bubble" (2023)	"Lit" (2023)

Music video
- "Bubble" on YouTube

"Bubble" is a song recorded by South Korean girl group STAYC for their third extended play Teenfresh. It was released as the EP's lead single by High Up Entertainment on August 16, 2023.

== Background and release ==
On July 24, 2023, High Up Entertainment announced STAYC would be releasing their third extended play titled Teenfresh on August 16. A day later, the promotional schedule was released. It was also announced that "Bubble" would serve as the lead single. On August 9, the first music video teaser for "Bubble" was released. Five days later, the highlight medley teaser video was released. On August 15, the second music video teaser for "Bubble" was released. The song was released alongside the extended play and its music video on August 16.

== Composition ==
"Bubble" was written and composed by duo B.E.P, with Jeon Goon participating in the lyrics writing, Flyt participating in the composition and arrangement, and the duo's Rado participating in the arrangement. It was described as a song characterized by "light synth bass" featuring "addictive hook that [the listener] will not forgot once [they] hear it". "Bubble" was composed in the key of A major, with a tempo of 132 beats per minute.

== Commercial performance ==
"Bubble" debuted at number 69 on South Korea's Circle Digital Chart, in the chart issue dated August 13–19, 2023, ascending to number 21 in the following week.

== Promotion ==
Prior to the release of Teenfresh, on August 16, 2023, the group held a live event to introduce the extended play and its songs, including "Bubble", and to communicate with their fans. The group subsequently performed on two music programs in the first week: KBS's Music Bank on August 18, and SBS's Inkigayo on August 20. On the second week of promotion, they performed on four music programs: Mnet's M Countdown on August 24, Music Bank on August 25, MBC's Show! Music Core on August 26, and Inkigayo on August 27. On the third week of promotion, they performed on two music programs: SBS M's The Show on August 29, MBC M's Show Champion on August 30, M Countdown on August 31, Music Bank on September 1, Show! Music Core on September 2, and Inkigayo on September 3, where they won first place for their appearance in The Show and Music Bank.

== Critical reception ==
Year-end lists for "Bubble"
Critic/Publication	List	Rank	Ref.
Dazed	Top 50 best K-pop tracks of 2023	7	

== Accolades ==
"Bubble" won two music program awards in South Korea. It won on the August 29 episode of The Show and the September 1, 2023, episode of Music Bank. "Bubble" won Music Video of the Year at the 2023 Melon Music Awards.

== Charts ==
=== Weekly charts ===
Weekly chart performance for "Bubble"
Chart (2023)	Peak position
South Korea (Circle)	11

=== Monthly charts ===
Monthly chart performance for "Bubble"
Chart (2023)	Position
South Korea (Circle)	11

=== Year-end charts ===
2023 year-end chart performance for "Bubble"
Chart (2023)	Position
South Korea (Circle)	95

2024 year-end chart performance for "Bubble"
Chart (2024)	Position
South Korea (Circle)	149

== Release history ==
Release history for "Bubble"
Region	Date	Format	Version	Label
Various	August 16, 2023	Digital download; streaming	Original	High Up; Kakao
Various	November 29, 2023	Digital download; streaming	Japanese	Universal Music Japan

== See also ==
- List of Music Bank Chart winners (2023)
- List of The Show Chart winners (2023)
