= The Sound (Stray Kids song) =

Single by Stray Kids

from the album The Sound
- Language: Japanese
- Released: January 28, 2023
- Genre: Electronic rock
- Length: 3:00
- Label: Epic Japan
- Composers: Bang Chan; Changbin; Han; Zack Djurich; Kyle Reynolds
- Lyricists: Bang Chan; Changbin; Han; D&H (Purple Night)

Stray Kids singles chronology
"Case 143" (2022)	"The Sound" (2023)	"S-Class" (2023)

Music video
- "The Sound" on YouTube

"The Sound" is a song recorded by South Korean boy band Stray Kids, taken from their debut Japanese-language studio album The Sound. It was released on January 28, 2023, as the album's lead single through Epic Records Japan. The song was written by 3Racha, D&H (Purple Night), Zack Djurich, and Kyle Reynolds.

== Background and release ==
On December 23, 2022, Stray Kids uploaded the trailer video to announce that they would release their debut Japanese-language studio album on February 22, 2023. The title of the album, The Sound, and its details were revealed on January 16, 2023, including the track listing, which appeared the title track, "The Sound", as the first track. The song was released initially on January 28, a month before its parent album release. The accompanying music video premiered on February 10, preceded by three teasers. The Korean version of the song was included on the group's third Korean-language studio album 5-Star.

== Composition ==
"The Sound" was written by 3Racha, an in-house production team of Stray Kids consisting of Bang Chan, Changbin and Han, and co-composed with American producers Zack Djurich and Kyle Reynolds. D&H (Purple Night) was handled in Japanese lyrics. It was composed in the key of F♯ minor, 188 beats per minute with a running time of three minutes. "The Sound" is an electronic rock song, depicts the group's confidence and attitude toward their music. Akiko Watabe from Real Sound described that the song "shows an insatiable passion for music with the contrast between stillness and movement."

== Live performances ==
Stray Kids gave the debut performance of "The Sound" at Music Station on January 27, 2023. They also performed the song at Buzz Rhythm 02 on February 17. The group added the song to the setlist of the encore shows of Maniac World Tour in Saitama and Osaka, Japan.

== Credits and personnel ==
Locations

- Sony Music Publishing (Japan) Inc. – publishing
- JYP Publishing (KOMCA) – publishing
- Copyright Control – publishing
- JYPE Studios – recording
- The Mastering Palace – mastering

Personnel

- Stray Kids – vocals, background vocals
  - Bang Chan (3Racha) – lyrics, composition, arrangement, all instruments, computer programming, vocal directing, digital editing
  - Changbin (3Racha) – lyrics, composition, vocal directing
  - Han (3Racha) – lyrics, composition, vocal directing
- D&H (Purple Night) – Japanese lyrics
- Zach Djurich – composition, arrangement, all instruments, computer programming
- Kyle Reynolds – composition, arrangement
- Lee Kyeong-won – digital editing
- Goo Hye-jin – recording
- Curtis Douglas – mixing
- Dave Kutch – mastering

== Charts ==
Chart performance for "The Sound"
Chart (2023)	Peak position
Hungary (Single Top 40)	12
Japan Hot 100 (Billboard)	34
Japan Combined Singles (Oricon)	26
South Korea Download (Circle) Korean version	74
US World Digital Song Sales (Billboard)	11

== Release history ==
Release dates and formats for "The Sound"
Region	Date	Format	Label	Ref.
Various	January 28, 2023	Digital download; streaming	Epic Japan	
