= S-Class (song) =

Single by Stray Kids

from the album 5-Star
- Language: Korean; English
- Released: June 2, 2023
- Studio: JYPE (Seoul)
- Genre: Hip hop
- Length: 3:16
- Label: JYP; Republic
- Composers: Bang Chan; Changbin; Han; Chae Gang-hae; Restart
- Lyricists: Bang Chan; Changbin; Han

Stray Kids singles chronology
| "The Sound" (2023) | "S-Class" (2023) | "Super Bowl" (Japanese ver.) (2023) |

Music video
- "S-Class" on YouTube

"S-Class" (Korean: 특; RR: Teuk; lit. 'Special') is a song by South Korean boy band Stray Kids, taken from their third Korean-language studio album 5-Star. It was released as the album's lead single on June 2, 2023, through JYP Entertainment and Republic Records.

== Background and release ==
Stray Kids' third Korean-language studio album 5-Star was first announced via a trailer on April 28, 2023, and set to be released on June 2. The album's Solar System-styled track listing was posted two days later. Out of 12 songs, "S-Class" appears as the second track and is marked as the lead single. JYP Entertainment described that the song "captures Stray Kids' newness and challenge itself throughout the song," as well as "overflowing with confidence." In an Esquire Korea interview in May, member Hyunjin described the lead single as "a unique and special feeling that Stray Kids is good at."

The song was first teased via the mashup video uploaded on May 26: "This is Seoul Special City / A special star rises among the hidden stars." (Note: Korean: 여긴 Seoul 특별시 / 가려진 별들 사이 떠오르는 특별; RR: Yeogin Seoul Teukbyeolsi / Garyeojin byeoldeul sai tteooreuneun teukbyeol) Member I.N revealed via the first episode of the album's documentary series Intro "5-Star" that it was around seven or eight nominated tracks for the lead single. "S-Class" was released alongside its parent album 5-Star on June 2.

== Composition and reception ==
"S-Class" was described as a primary hip hop track with the elements of boom bap, old school, and pop, written by 3Racha—an in-house production team of Stray Kids members Bang Chan, Changbin, and Han—and co-composed Chae Gang-hae and Restart, who are also in charge of arrangement with Bang Chan. In an interview with Dispatch, Changbin and Han told that "There are various genres, but it is difficult to decide on one genre. After all, is not 'S-Class' a genre unique to Stray Kids? The genre is Stray Kids." In the second verse, the song's BPM and beats have suddenly changed to a 90's old-school hip-hop arrangement.

The song expresses Stray Kids' confidence and "emphasiz[ing] their specialness," containing the messages "the most eccentric among the unusual kids, and the brightest among the special kids," as well as comparing themselves as a "most special star in the sky." NME's Crystal Bell described the song as "a mishmash of seemingly incongruous parts fused together by 3Racha's shapeshifting production prowess;" it was mixed between "booming rap, thrumming bass, sultry electro, '90s hip-hop, sparkling pop and grimy club." Writing for Nylon, Steffanee Wang called the song "sounds like listening to three different songs at once. In a good way."

== Music video ==
An accompanying music video for "S-Class" was uploaded on June 2, 2023, in conjunction with the single release. It was directed by Bang Jae-yeob and preceded by two teasers. Described as a "blockbuster movie", the music video shows Stray Kids surrounded by cloaked figures when a massive team of soldiers burst into action, killing an octopus monster at the indoor swimming pool with the boyband leading the way. The dance performance parts were additionally shot at a docking platform installed in the middle of Han River, a neighborhood setting, an underground chamber, and a bank after hours. Some parts also referred to the group's previous music videos of "God's Menu" and "Thunderous". The music video became the tenth music video to reach 100 million views on August 8, and the fifth to reach 200 million views on June 2, 2024.

== Live performances ==
Starting on June 2, the release date, Stray Kids performed "S-Class" at several music programs in South Korea, such as Music Bank, Show! Music Core, Inkigayo, and M Countdown. The group also performed "S-Class" at 2023 MTV Video Music Awards on September 12, and 2023 Billboard Music Awards on November 19, the latter alongside "Lalalala". Billboard ranked the former show the sixth best performance of the award show, while USA Today thirteenth. They performed the song and "Social Path" with Lisa at Music Station Super Live 2023 on December 22. In May 2024, the group appeared at the 2024 YouTube Brandcast in New York City and performed "S-Class".

== Accolades ==
Awards and nominations for "S-Class"
| Ceremony | Year | Award | Result | Ref. |
|---|---|---|---|---|
| Asian Pop Music Awards | 2023 | Best Music Video | Nominated | |
| Asian Pop Music Awards | 2023 | Best Arranger (Note: Credited as Chae Gang-hae, Restart, and Bang Chan (3Racha)) | Nominated | |
| Asian Pop Music Awards | 2023 | Top 20 Songs of the Year | Won | |
| iHeartRadio Music Awards | 2024 | K-pop Song of the Year | Nominated | |
| MAMA Awards | 2023 | Song of the Year | Nominated | |
| MAMA Awards | 2023 | Best Dance Performance – Male Group | Nominated | |
| MAMA Awards | 2023 | Best Music Video | Nominated | |
| MTV Video Music Awards | 2023 | Best K-Pop | Won | |

Music program awards
| Program | Date | Ref. |
|---|---|---|
| Show Champion | June 7, 2023 | |
| Show Champion | June 14, 2023 | |
| M Countdown | June 8, 2023 | |
| M Countdown | June 15, 2023 | |
| Music Bank | June 9, 2023 | |
| Music Bank | June 16, 2023 | |

== Credits and personnel ==
Personnel

- Stray Kids – vocals, background vocals
  - Bang Chan (3Racha) – lyrics, composition, arrangement, all instruments, computer programming, digital editing
  - Changbin (3Racha) – lyrics, composition
  - Han (3Racha) – lyrics, composition
- Chae Gang-hae – composition, arrangement, all instruments, computer programming
- Restart – composition, arrangement, all instruments, computer programming, digital editing
- Goo Hye-jin – recording
- Manny Marroquin – mixing
- Chris Galland – mix engineering
  - Ramiro Fernandez-Seoane – assistant
- Dave Kutch – mastering

Locations

- JYP Publishing (KOMCA) – original publishing, sub-publishing
- Copyright Control – original publishing, sub-publishing
- JYPE Studios – recording
- Larrabee Studios – mixing
- The Mastering Palace – mastering

== Charts ==
=== Weekly charts ===
Weekly chart performance for "S-Class"
| Chart (2023) | Peak position |
|---|---|
| Australia (ARIA) | 67 |
| Canada Hot 100 (Billboard) | 96 |
| Global 200 (Billboard) | 24 |
| Hungary (Single Top 40) | 13 |
| Japan Hot 100 (Billboard) | 8 |
| Japan Combined Singles (Oricon) | 10 |
| Lithuania (AGATA) | 61 |
| Malaysia (Billboard) | 17 |
| Malaysia International (RIM) | 11 |
| New Zealand Hot Singles (RMNZ) | 8 |
| Singapore (RIAS) | 9 |
| South Korea (Circle) | 34 |
| UK Singles (Official Charts) | 100 |
| US Bubbling Under Hot 100 (Billboard) | 19 |
| US Digital Song Sales (Billboard) | 22 |
| US World Digital Song Sales (Billboard) | 2 |
| Vietnam (Vietnam Hot 100) | 59 |

=== Monthly charts ===
Monthly chart performance for "S-Class"
| Chart (2023) | Position |
|---|---|
| South Korea (Circle) | 51 |

=== Year-end charts ===
Year-end chart performance for "S-Class"
| Chart (2023) | Position |
|---|---|
| South Korea Download (Circle) | 68 |

== Certifications ==
Certifications for "S-Class"
| Region | Certification | Certified units/sales |
|---|---|---|
| United States (RIAA) | Gold | 500,000^{‡} |
Streaming
| Japan (RIAJ) | Platinum | 100,000,000^{†} |
^{‡} Sales+streaming figures based on certification alone.^{†} Streaming-only figures based on certification alone.

== See also ==
- List of M Countdown Chart winners (2023)
- List of Music Bank Chart winners (2023)
- List of Show Champion Chart winners (2023)
