= 5-Star (Stray Kids album) =

- Digital cover

Studio album by Stray Kids
- Released: June 2, 2023
- Studios: JYPE (Seoul); Channie's "Room" (Seoul); Feel Ghood (Seoul)
- Genres: Hip-hop; pop; electronica
- Length: 36:35
- Languages: Korean; English
- Labels: JYP; Republic
- Producers: 3Racha; Versachoi; Chae Gang-hae; Restart; Zack Djurich; Millionboy; Trippy; Nickko Young; Kyle Reynolds; Chris LaRocca; Jun2

Stray Kids chronology
The Sound (2023)	5-Star (2023)	Social Path / Super Bowl (Japanese Ver.) (2023)

Singles from 5-Star
- 1. "S-Class" Released: June 2, 2023

5-Star (stylized as ★★★★★) is the third Korean-language studio album (fourth overall) by South Korean boy band Stray Kids. It was released on June 2, 2023, through JYP Entertainment and Republic Records, following their seventh EP Maxident (2022). A combination of hip-hop, pop, and electronica elements, 5-Star lyrically addresses themes of uniqueness, confidence, and aspirations.

On the album, 3Racha worked with songwriters and producers Versachoi, Chae Gang-hae, Restart, Zack Djurich, Millionboy, Trippy, Nickko Young, Kyle Reynolds, Chris LaRocca, and Jun2, as well as member Felix. It comprises twelve tracks, including the lead single "S-Class", the Korean version of "The Sound", originally from the group's Japanese album of the same name and "Mixtape: Time Out" from the Mixtape Project, and features a guest appearance from Tiger JK on the track "Topline".

5-Star generally received generally positive reviews from music critics. Commercially, the album peaked at number one in South Korea, Austria, Belgium, France, Greece, Hungary, Poland, Portugal, and the United States. It was certified quintuple million by Korea Music Content Association (KMCA), and gold in France, Poland, and the United States, and became the second global best-selling album in 2023, according to the International Federation of the Phonographic Industry (IFPI). The album won Top K-Pop Album at the 2023 Billboard Music Awards, Artist of the Year – Album from 13th Circle Chart Music Awards, and Best Album (Bonsang) at the 38th Golden Disc Awards.

== Background ==
Stray Kids' follow-up Korean-language album to Maxident was first mentioned in an interview with the news outlet The Fact in October 2022, after the group won the Artist of the Year (Bonsang) and Fan N Star Four Star Award at The Fact Music Awards in 2022. Member Seungmin stated that they would return with an "amazing" album the following year, possibly including new sub-unit combinations and exploring new music genres. On New Year's Day in 2023, the group uploaded the video "Step Out 2023" to their social media, outlining their accomplishments in 2022 and plans for the new year, including two album releases.

In early March 2023, Hankook Ilbo first reported that Stray Kids had already finished filming a music video for the new album's lead single and that it was scheduled for release in April. On the same day, JYP Entertainment subsequently confirmed the music video filming, although not the release date. Financial analysts and researchers also estimated that the group's new album would come in the second quarter of 2023. In late April, after the group concluded their Maniac World Tour, SpoTV News reported that the group would release a new album in early June. JYP Entertainment confirmed the news. Titled 5-Star, the album was formally announced via a trailer on April 28, set to be released on June 2. The title refers to the lead single "S-Class", playing around two words "special" and "star".

== Music and lyrics ==
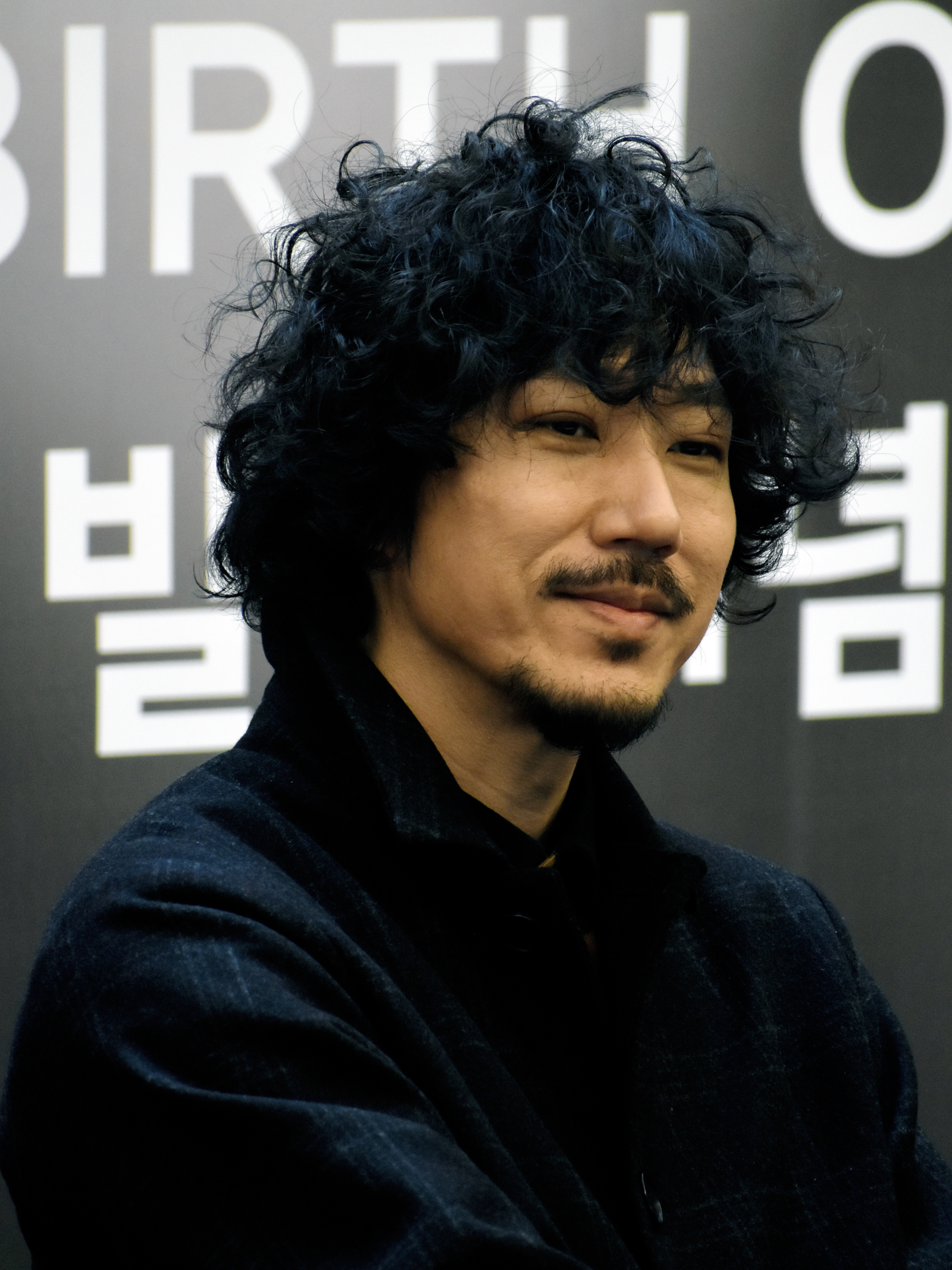
Tiger JK (pictured) features on the fifth track "Topline".

5-Star is 36 minutes and 35 seconds long, consisting of twelve tracks in the genres of hip-hop, pop, and electronica. 3Racha—an in-house production team of Stray Kids members Bang Chan, Changbin, and Han—wrote and produced all songs on the album. Other contributors include Versachoi, Chae Gang-hae, Restart, Zack Djurich, Millionboy, Trippy, Nickko Young, Kyle Reynolds, Chris LaRocca, and Jun2, as well as member Felix who participated in two tracks, "Super Bowl" and "FNF". Korean-American rapper Tiger JK features on and co-wrote the fifth track "Topline". A "strange yet special" release, the album centered on the theme of the group's uniqueness, confidence, aspirations, and achieving their goal, based on their discourse of growth and identity.

=== Songs ===
The opening track, "Hall of Fame", is a fusion of R&B and trap metal, expressing Stray Kids' ambition to make their own history and engrave their names on the hall of fame. It includes lyrical references to American inventor and businessman Thomas Edison and astronaut Neil Armstrong, English playwright and poet William Shakespeare and theoretical physicist Stephen Hawking, Italian astronomer and physicist Galileo Galilei, and South Korean professional League of Legends player Faker. "S-Class" is a hip-hop track with elements of boom bap, old school, and pop, expressing Stray Kids' confidence and "emphasiz[ing] their specialness", and containing a message of being "the most eccentric among the unusual kids, and the brightest among the special kids". "Item", a video game-themed hip-hop track, displays their confidence of synergy and ability on [their] own without any special items.

Originally titled "God's Menu" and intended to be the lead single from their first studio album Go Live (2020), the fully English-language track "Super Bowl", showing homage to the American football championship game of the same name, compares Stray Kids' music as cooking and a food dish, driven by techno sound, and including whispering in a manner similar to ASMR. "Topline" is a minimalistic boom bap, old-school and East-Coast hip-hop track, comparing their ambition to drawing a line on the top, while "DLC", short for "Dance Like Crazy", is a moombahton, deep house, and tropical house song with Eurodance influences, driven by piano, flute-like synth, and brass. The song expresses a feeling of leaving any worries behind and dancing like crazy. "Get Lit", a mix of moombahton and bounce EDM, depicts an "escape from cramped daily life and dying today", while "Collision" is a jazzy R&B track featuring saxophone sample, conveying the theme of relationship conflict as the collision of two planets.

A tribute to the bushfire season from 2019 to 2020 in Australia, "FNF", shortened for "flora and fauna", expresses a feeling of regret and longing felt by seeing animals and plants lose their lives due to the wildfire with EDM sound. The piano-and-guitar ballad, "Youtiful", a portmanteau of "you" and "beautiful", talks about self-esteem, intending to show "warm and comfortable support and consolation" of how everyone is beautiful and amazing as they are. "The Sound" is an electronic rock track, depicting the group's confidence and attitude toward their music. The album closes with "Mixtape: Time Out", a punk—pop rock track, reminiscing about Stray Kids' trip to Gangwon-do before beginning the promotion of their EP Oddinary.

== Release and promotion ==
On April 28, 2023, Stray Kids uploaded a three-minute trailer to announce 5-Star. Based on Korean game I Am Ground, the trailer sees the members each introducing themselves with their chosen nickname in individual shots before uniting in the same scene. Pre-orders of album opened on the same day as the trailer's release, being made available in five versions with 12 different covers: limited, standard A, B and C, and eight digipacks. The album's Solar System-styled track listing, constellation-styled scheduler, and digital cover artwork were posted to social media on April 30. The track listing confirmed "S-Class" as the lead single, and included the Korean version of "The Sound", originally from their Japanese album of the same name and the 2022 single "Mixtape: Time Out" from the Mixtape Project as part of the album.

Prior to the release, the group teased snippets of five tracks of 5-Star via the series "Unveil: Track": "DLC", "FNF", "Get Lit", "Topline", and "Youtiful", as well as the other tracks via the live action-and-comics-fusion mashup video. The album's teaser photos were revealed in four sets. The first depicts the members wearing colorful outfits and posing in front of 1980s-styled backgrounds combining Korean traditional art and everyday life items. The second, alongside accompanying mood films, shows the melancholy-eyed members, wearing "mix-and-matched" outfits, posting on the street at night illuminated by street light. The third expresses the members, wearing the same outfits as the trailer, posting with various music instruments and loudspeakers, while the fourth shows the members in black clothes with the vintage cars background, adding oriental-styled "kitsch" illustrations of pine trees, clouds, tigers, and cranes.

5-Star was released on June 2, 2023, in conjunction with the music video for "S-Class", preceded by two music video teasers. The documentary series Intro "5-Star", consisting of three episodes, was released between June 1 and 11. Starting on the release date, Stray Kids promoted the album and performed the lead single at several music programs, such as Music Bank, Show! Music Core, Inkigayo, and M Countdown. To commemorate the release, Stray Kids partnered with Soundwave for launching a pop-up store from June 3 to 18 at Seongdong-gu, Seoul, as well as launching SKZoo characters' sticker set for KakaoTalk on June 27. Stray Kids' space-themed third fan meeting Pilot: For 5-Star supported the album, held at KSPO Dome from July 1 to 2, which they previously specified as a mysterious "What's Next" on the promotional scheduler, and debuted the performance of "Item". The group headlined the Lollapalooza music festival in Paris on July 21, performing songs from 5-Star: "S-Class", "Topline", "Item", and "Super Bowl", and embarked on their all-dome concert tour 5-Star Dome Tour in South Korea and Japan from August to October.

== Critical reception ==
Professional ratings
Review scores
Source	Rating
AllMusic	4/5 stars
IZM	3/5 stars
NME	5/5 stars

South Korean music critic Kim Do-heon praised the album as "a clever piece of work" and "a well-thought-out K-pop blockbuster", because of "the performance shown by the members who claim to be madmen, the spectacular production, and the mature narrative of growth." Crystal Bell from NME awarded the album five out of five stars, writing that it "will make you feel like you arrived at a party that's already in full-swing. [...] 5-Star is disorienting in that way. But once your senses adapt to the frenzy and your body syncs to the rhythm, you lose yourself in its luminescence."

Writing for Ize, Kim Sung-dae revealed that he "does not want to give [5-Star] five stars as the title", and questioned, "Isn't it a blessing in some way that incompleteness can be a compliment?" He summarized that "to critics, five stars mean a perfect score, but to Stray Kids, 5-Star just means 'weird and brilliant.'" Lee Jae-hoon of Newsis dubbed the album as a "K-pop adventure". AllMusic's Neil Z. Young described that the album "wild ride[s] through genres and emotions," and "playing out like a hit to the head with a dozen anthems that only briefly allow for a breather." Jeong Da-yeol from IZM commented the album "although the instrumental source and composition of each section with irregularities in the genre may take on a crude appearance, it took a familiar ride, arranged addictive repetitions, and hit the listeners' brains safely."

Critics' rankings of 5-Star
Publication	Accolade	Rank	Ref.
Billboard	The 25 Best K-Pop Albums of 2023	9	
Paste	The 20 Best K-pop Albums of 2023	5	

== Accolades ==
List of awards and nominations received by 5-Star
Ceremony	Year	Category	Result	Ref.
Asia Star Entertainer Awards	2024	Album of the Year	Won	
Asian Pop Music Awards	2023	Best Album of the Year – Overseas	Nominated	
Asian Pop Music Awards	2023	Best Group – Overseas	Won	
Asian Pop Music Awards	2023	Record of the Year – Overseas	Nominated	
Asian Pop Music Awards	2023	Top 20 Albums of the Year	Won	
Billboard Music Awards	2023	Top K-Pop Album	Won	
Circle Chart Music Awards	2024	Artist of the Year – Album	Won	
Golden Disc Awards	2024	Best Album (Bonsang)	Won	
iHeartRadio Music Awards	2024	K-Pop Album of the Year	Won	
MAMA Awards	2023	Album of the Year	Nominated	
Melon Music Awards	2023	Millions Top 10	Nominated	

== Commercial performance ==
On May 30, 2023, two days before the release, JYP Entertainment reported that 5-Star had exceeded 4.93 million pre-orders, and 5.13 million two days later. It became the most pre-ordered release in K-pop history, breaking the record of Seventeen's FML (2023) with 4.64 million copies. Later, it was surpassed by Seventeen's EP Seventeenth Heaven in October. According to the Hanteo Chart, the album sold 2,392,666 copies on its first day of release, and later 4,617,499 in its first week, becoming the fastest first-week selling album in South Korea, besting FML. 5-Star debuted at number one on the Circle Album Chart for the issue dated May 28 – June 3, 2023, and topped for two consecutive weeks. It sold 4,330,039 copies in its first week, and 5,242,486 copies in June, certified quintuple million by Korea Music Content Association (KMCA).

5-Star debuted at number one on the Billboard 200 for the issue dated June 17, 2023, becoming the group's third entry and third consecutive number-one album in the United States. With 249,500 equivalent album units, it marks the fourth-largest week by any album released in 2023, including 235,000 pure album sales—231,000 CDs and 4,000 digital albums—the biggest sales week of 2023 and since Taylor Swift's Midnights (2022), opened with over 1.1 million units. 5-Star is also the 19th overall non-English-language number-one album, and the third of 2023, following Karol G's Mañana Será Bonito, and Tomorrow X Together's The Name Chapter: Temptation. It also topped the specific-genre World Albums. The album reached number 82 on the 2023 Billboard 200 year-end chart, the highest charted K-pop album in the year. 5-Star received gold certification from Recording Industry Association of America (RIAA) on October 27, their first album to do so.

In Japan, 5-Star peaked at number two on the Oricon Albums Chart, and number six on the Billboard Japan Hot Albums. The album also topped in several national charts in Europe: Austria, Belgium (both Flanders and Wallonia regions), France, Greece, Hungary, Poland, and Portugal, as well as peaking at number two in Germany, and Switzerland, and top ten in Denmark, Finland, Italy, Lithuania, and the Netherlands. For the UK Albums Chart, it became their first top-40 album in the country, debuted at number 40. In Australia, the album peaked at number two on the ARIA Albums Chart; it is the group's highest peak and their third top-50 entry after Noeasy (2021), and Maxident (2022),

According to the International Federation of the Phonographic Industry (IFPI)'s Global Music Report for 2023, 5-Star was the second most-consumed album across all formats, and the second best-selling album worldwide, having sold 5.3 million units. (Note: The IFPI Global Albums chart ranks, in order, the albums that generated the most money globally across streaming, download, and physical record sales (combined) in a calendar year. The Global Album Sales Chart measures global unit sales across all physical formats, as well as full album downloads.)

== Track listing ==
5-Star track listing
No.	Title	Lyrics	Music	Arrangement	Length
1.	"Hall of Fame" (위인전)	Bang Chan (3Racha); Changbin (3Racha); Han (3Racha)	Bang Chan; Changbin; Han; Versachoi	Versachoi; Bang Chan	2:51
2.	"S-Class" (특)	Bang Chan; Changbin; Han	Bang Chan; Changbin; Han; Chae Gang-hae; Restart	Chae; Restart; Bang Chan	3:16
3.	"Item"	Bang Chan; Changbin; Han	Bang Chan; Changbin; Han; Versachoi	Versachoi; Bang Chan	3:12
4.	"Super Bowl"	Bang Chan; Changbin; Han; Felix	Bang Chan; Changbin; Han; Zack Djurich	Djurich; Bang Chan	3:03
5.	"Topline" (featuring Tiger JK)	Bang Chan; Changbin; Han; Tiger JK	Bang Chan; Changbin; Han; Versachoi	Versachoi	3:24
6.	"DLC"	Changbin; Restart	Changbin; Restart	Restart; Changbin	3:06
7.	"Get Lit" (죽어보자)	Han	Han; Chae; Restart	Chae; Restart	2:51
8.	"Collision" (충돌)	Han	Han; Millionboy	Millionboy	2:38
9.	"FNF"	Bang Chan; Felix	Bang Chan; Felix; Trippy	Trippy; Bang Chan	2:52
10.	"Youtiful"	Bang Chan	Bang Chan; Nickko Young	Nickko Young	3:29
11.	"The Sound" (Korean version)	Bang Chan; Changbin; Han	Bang Chan; Changbin; Han; Djurich; Kyle Reynolds; Chris LaRocca	Djurich; Reynolds; Bang Chan; LaRocca	2:58
12.	"Mixtape: Time Out"	Bang Chan; Changbin; Han	Bang Chan; Changbin; Han; Versachoi; Jun2	Versachoi; Bang Chan; Jun2	2:55
Total length:					36:35

== Credits and personnel ==
Musicians

- Stray Kids – vocals (all), background vocals (2, 4, 11)
  - Bang Chan (3Racha) – background vocals (1, 3, 5–6, 9–10, 12), all instruments (2, 4, 10), computer programming (1–4, 9–10), bass (9), synthesizer (9), drum (9), vocal directing (10)
  - Changbin (3Racha) – background vocals (1, 3, 5–6), vocal directing (10)
  - Han (3Racha) – background vocals (1, 3, 5–8), vocal directing (10)
  - Felix – background vocals (5, 9)
  - Seungmin – background vocals (6)
- Versachoi – synthesizer (1, 3, 5), drum (1, 3, 5, 12), bass (1, 3, 5), computer programming (1, 3, 5, 12)
- Chae Gang-hae – all instruments (2, 7), computer programming (2, 7)
- Restart – all instruments (2, 5, 7), computer programming (2, 5, 7)
- Zack Djurich – all instruments (4, 10), computer programming (4, 10)
- Millionboy – all instruments (8)
- Trippy – bass (9), synthesizer (9), drum (9), piano (9), computer programming (9)
- Nickko Young – guitar (10, 12), piano (10), drum (10)
- Kim Hong-seo – bass (10)
- Lee Jae-myung – bass (12)

Technical

- Lee Kyeong-won – digital editing (1, 3–5, 8–12)
- Restart – digital editing (2, 6–7)
- Bang Chan (3Racha) – digital editing (2, 11), recording (12)
- Lee Sang-yeop – recording (1, 10)
- Goo Hye-jin – recording (2–3, 5–7, 9, 11)
- Lim Chan-mi – recording (4, 7–8)
- Park Jae-seon – recording (5)
- Yoon Won-kwon – mixing (1, 3–5, 7–9)
- Manny Marroquin – mixing (2)
- Jay-P Gu – mixing (6, 10)
- Curtis Douglas – mixing (11)
- MasterKey – mixing (12)
- Chris Galland – mix engineering (2)
  - Ramiro Fernandez-Seoane – assistant
- Kwon Nam-woo – mastering (1, 3–10, 12)
- Dave Kutch – mastering (2, 11)
- Shin Bong-won – Dolby Atmos mixing (all)
  - Park Nam-joon – assistant

Locations

- JYP Publishing (KOMCA) – original publishing (all), sub-publishing (all)
- Copyright Control – original publishing (2, 4, 6–7, 10–11), sub-publishing (2, 4, 6–7, 10–11)
- Feel Ghood Music (KOMCA) – original publishing (5), sub-publishing (5)
- Mixed Metaphor Music (BMI) – original publishing (11)
- Kyle Reynolds Music (BMI) – original publishing (11)
- Kilometre Music Group B / Little Italy Music Inc. (SOCAN) – original publishing (11)
- JYPE Studios – recording (1–11)
- Feel Ghood Studio – recording (5)
- Channie's "Room" – recording (12)
- Studio DDeepKick – mixing (1, 3–5, 7–9)
- Larrabee Studios – mixing (2)
- Klang Studio – mixing (6, 10)
- 821 Sound – mixing (12), mastering (1, 3–10, 12)
- The Mastering Palace – mastering (2, 11)
- Glab Studios – Dolby Atmos mixing (all)

== Charts ==
=== Weekly charts ===
Weekly chart performance for 5-Star
Chart (2023)	Peak position
Australian Albums (ARIA)	2
Austrian Albums (Ö3 Austria)	1
Belgian Albums (Ultratop Flanders)	1
Belgian Albums (Ultratop Wallonia)	1
Canadian Albums (Billboard)	10
Croatian International Albums (HDU)	3
Danish Albums (Hitlisten)	4
Dutch Albums (Album Top 100)	3
Finnish Albums (Suomen virallinen lista)	7
French Albums (SNEP)	1
German Albums (Offizielle Top 100)	2
Greek Albums (IFPI)	1
Hungarian Albums (MAHASZ)	1
Irish Albums (IRMA)	76
Italian Albums (FIMI)	10
Japanese Albums (Oricon)	2
Japanese Combined Albums (Oricon)	2
Japanese Hot Albums (Billboard Japan)	6
Lithuanian Albums (AGATA)	4
New Zealand Albums (RMNZ)	7
Norwegian Albums (VG-lista)	25
Polish Albums (ZPAV)	1
Portuguese Albums (AFP)	1
South Korean Albums (Circle)	1
Spanish Albums (Promusicae)	5
Swedish Albums (Sverigetopplistan)	11
Swiss Albums (Schweizer Hitparade)	2
UK Albums (Official Charts)	40
US Billboard 200	1
US World Albums (Billboard)	1

=== Monthly charts ===
Monthly chart performance for 5-Star
Chart (2023)	Position
Japanese Albums (Oricon)	4
South Korean Albums (Circle)	1

=== Year-end charts ===
2023 year-end chart performance for 5-Star
Chart (2023)	Position
Austrian Albums (Ö3 Austria)	48
Belgian Albums (Ultratop Flanders)	46
Belgian Albums (Ultratop Wallonia)	84
French Albums (SNEP)	52
German Albums (Offizielle Top 100)	26
Global Albums (IFPI)	2
Hungarian Albums (MAHASZ)	5
Japanese Albums (Oricon)	23
Japanese Download Albums (Billboard Japan)	43
Polish Albums (ZPAV)	33
Portuguese Albums (AFP)	6
South Korean Albums (Circle)	2
Swiss Albums (Schweizer Hitparade)	46
US Billboard 200	82
US World Albums (Billboard)	1

2024 year-end chart performance for 5-Star
Chart (2024)	Position
Croatian International Albums (HDU)	35

== Certifications and sales ==
Certifications and sales for 5-Star
Region	Certification	Certified units/sales
France (SNEP)	Gold	50,000^{‡}
Japan Physical	—	207,554
Japan Digital	—	4,122
Poland (ZPAV)	Gold	10,000^{‡}
South Korea (KMCA)	5× Million	5,258,829
United States (RIAA)	Gold	526,000
Summaries
Worldwide (IFPI)	—	5,300,000
^{‡} Sales+streaming figures based on certification alone.

== Release history ==
Release dates and formats for 5-Star
Region	Date	Format	Version	Label	Ref.
Various	June 2, 2023	CD; digital download; streaming	Limited; A; B; C	JYP; Republic	
South Korea	June 2, 2023	CD	Digipack	JYP; Republic	
United States	June 6, 2023	Digital download	Exclusive digital	JYP; Republic	
United States	July 7, 2023	CD	Digipack	JYP; Republic	

== See also ==
- List of Billboard 200 number-one albums of 2023
- List of Circle Album Chart number ones of 2023
- List of number-one albums of 2023 (Belgium)
- List of number-one albums of 2023 (Poland)
- List of number-one albums of 2023 (Portugal)
- List of number-one hits of 2023 (Austria)
- List of number-one hits of 2023 (France)
