= List of songs written by Han =

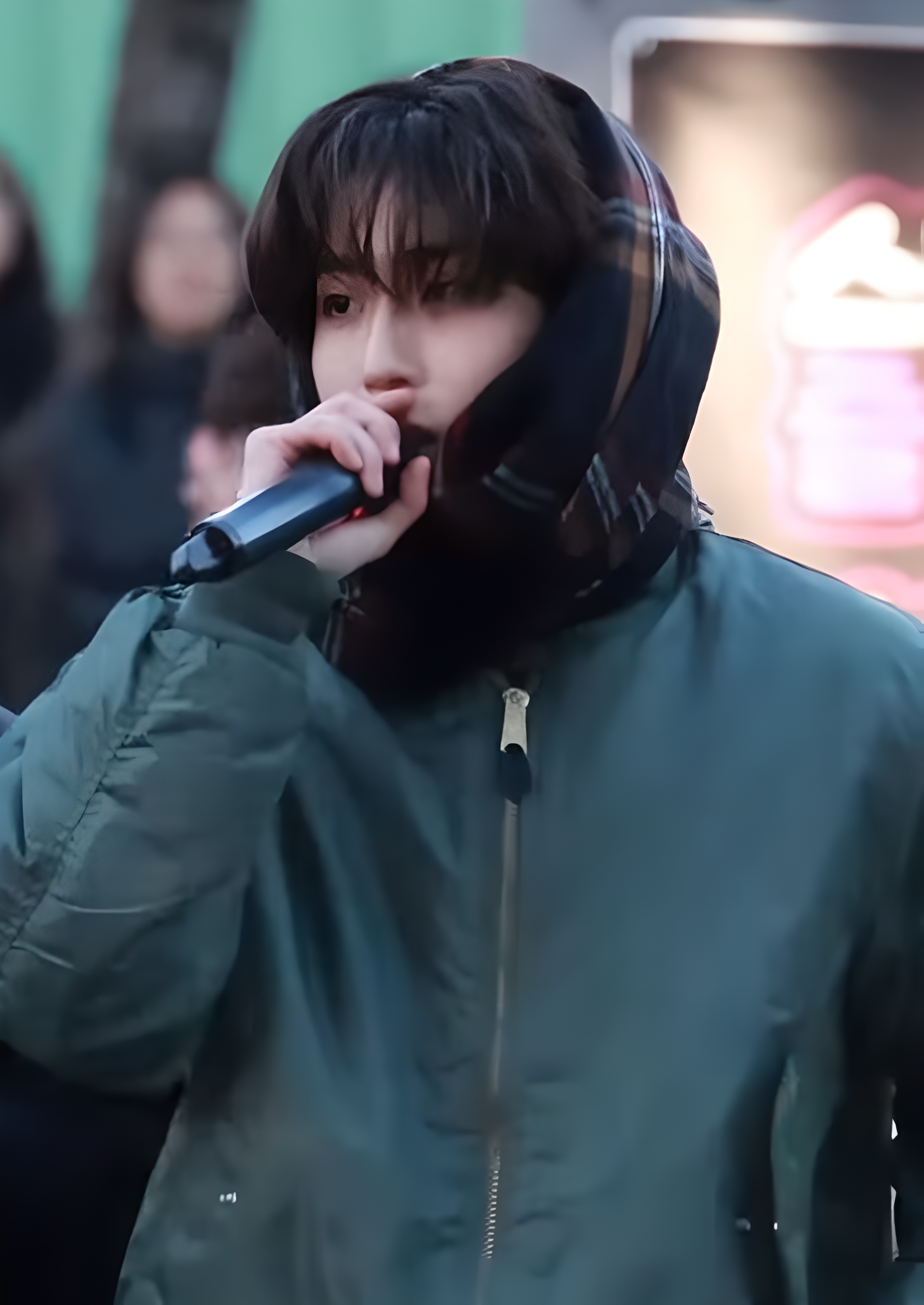
Han in November 2023

South Korean rapper, singer, and songwriter Han Ji-sung, known by his stage name Han. As a member of the South Korean boy band Stray Kids and its hip-hop and production sub-unit, 3Racha, Han has contributed in crafting the group's sound alongside his bandmates Bang Chan and Changbin.

In 2023, Han became the youngest K-pop idol to gain full membership in the Korea Music Copyright Association (KOMCA). As of April 2025, he has accumulated songwriting credits for 173 songs registered with KOMCA. His work includes original compositions for television series such as Pop Out Boy!, Re:Revenge - In the End of Desire, and Tower of God, as well as songs featured in films like Doraemon: Nobita's Sky Utopia and Deadpool & Wolverine.

Han was the sole lyricist for several tracks in Stray Kids' discography, including "Another Day" featured on Go Live, "Get Lit" and "Collision" from 5-Star, "Secret Secret" included in Noeasy, "Sunshine" on Clé: Levanter, "Twilight" on Ate, which was ranked third by Billboard in their review of all tracks on the album, and the single "Winter Falls" released in Christmas EveL. Han has also written and composed tracks for other artists, including "No Idea" by Show Lo, "Paradise" by NiziU, "Nevermind" by Yao Chen, and "Yolo-konde" by JO1. Han as 3Racha has received the Best Creator Award at the 2023 Asia Artist Awards for his works as a songwriter.

== Songs ==
Key
†	Indicates single
#	Indicates a non-commercial release
‡	Indicates songs written solely by Han
⁂	Song available in Korean and Japanese

Song title, original artist, album of release, and year of release
Song	Artist(s)	Lyricist(s)	Composer(s)	Album	Year	Ref.
"0325"	Stray Kids	Bang Chan, Changbin, Han	Bang Chan; Changbin; Han; Hong Ji-sang	I Am You	2018	
"1, 2, 3, 4, 5" ‡ #	Han featuring Bae of Nmixx	Han	Han; Helixx (Vendors)	SKZ-Record track	2024	
"13" ‡ #	Han	Han	Han; Helixx; Zenur (Vendors)	SKZ-Record track	2024	
"19" ‡	Stray Kids	Han	Bang Chan; Han	Clé 1: Miroh	2019	
"3Racha"	3Racha	Bang Chan; Changbin; Han	Bang Chan; Changbin; Han	Maxident	2022	
"3rd Eye"	Stray Kids	Bang Chan; Changbin; Han	Bang Chan; Changbin; Han; This N That	I Am Not	2018	
"4419"	Stray Kids	Bang Chan; Changbin; Han; Hyunjin; Seungmin	Bang Chan; Changbin; Han; RealBros (Ohwon Lee)	Mixtape	2018	
"Alien" (외계인) ‡ #	Han	Han	Han; Bang Chan	SKZ-Replay	2021	
"All In" †	Stray Kids	Bang Chan; Changbin; Han; J.Y. Park "The Asiansoul"; KM-Markit	J.Y. Park "The Asiansoul"; Bang Chan; Changbin; Han; Young Chance	All In (EP)	2020	
"All In" (Korean version)	Stray Kids	Bang Chan; Changbin; Han; J.Y. Park "The Asiansoul"	J.Y. Park "The Asiansoul"; Bang Chan; Changbin; Han	Non-album single	2020	
"All My Life" (Stray Kids remix)	Lil Durk featuring Stray Kids	Durk Banks; Jermaine Cole; Łukasz Gottwald; Rocco Valdes; Ryan Ogren; Gamal Lewis; Theron Thomas; Bang Chan; Changbin; Han		Almost Healed	2023	
"Another Day" (일상) ‡	Stray Kids	Han	Han; Bang Chan	Go Live	2020	
"Anthem" #	Stray Kids	Bang Chan; Changbin; Han	Bang Chan; Changbin; Han	Non-album single (Note: Pilot : For 5-Star)	2023	
"Any" (아니)	Stray Kids	Bang Chan; Changbin; Han	Bang Chan; Changbin; Han; Matluck; Tele	In Life	2020	
"Astronaut"	Stray Kids	Bang Chan; Changbin; Han	Bang Chan; Changbin; Han; Lorenzo Cosi; YK Koi	Clé: Levanter	2019	
"Awaken"	Stray Kids	Bang Chan; Changbin; Han	Bang Chan; Changbin; Han; Kim Park Chella	I Am Not	2018	
"Awkward Silence" (갑자기 분위기 싸해질 필요 없잖아요)	Stray Kids	Bang Chan; Changbin; Han	Bang Chan; Changbin; Han; Time	I Am Who	2018	
"B Me"	Stray Kids	Bang Chan; Changbin; Han; Earattack	Bang Chan; Changbin; Han; Earattack	In Life	2020	
"Back Door" † ⁂	Stray Kids	Bang Chan; Changbin; Han	Bang Chan; Changbin; Han; HotSauce	In Life; All In	2020	
"Back Door" (Loud version) #	Team JYP	Bang Chan; Changbin; Han	Bang Chan; Changbin; Han; HotSauce	Non-album single (Note: Loud Live Round -Final Debut-)	2021	
"Battle Ground"	Stray Kids	Bang Chan; Changbin; Han; KM Markit	Bang Chan; Changbin; Han; Frants	The Sound	2023	
"Battle Ground" (Korean version)	Stray Kids	Bang Chan; Changbin; Han	Bang Chan; Changbin; Han; Frants	Non-album single (Note: 5-Star Dome Tour 2023 Seoul Special (Unveil 13))	2023	
"Behind the Light" (그림자도 빛이 있어야 존재)	Stray Kids	Bang Chan; Changbin; Han; Hyunjin; Lee Know; Seungmin; I.N; Felix	Bang Chan; Lee Know; Changbin; Hyunjin; Han; Felix; Seungmin; I.N	SKZ2021	2021	
"Blind Spot" (사각지대)	Stray Kids	Bang Chan; Changbin; Han	Bang Chan; Changbin; Han; Willie Weeks	Rock-Star	2023	
"Blueprint" (청사진)	Stray Kids	Lee Su-Ran; Bang Chan; Changbin; Han	Earattack; Eniac	Go Live	2020	
"Booster"	Stray Kids	Bang Chan; Changbin; Han	Christian Fast; Henrik Nordenback; Albin Nordqvist	Clé: Levanter	2019	
"Bounce Back"	Stray Kids	Bang Chan; Han	Versachoi Bang Chan Han	Hop	2024	
"Boxer"	Stray Kids	Bang Chan; Changbin; Han	Bang Chan; Changbin; Han; Glory Face (Full8loom); Jake K (Full8loom)	Clé 1: Miroh	2019	
"Broken Compass"	Stray Kids	Bang Chan; Changbin; Han; Hyunjin; Lee Know; Seungmin; I.N; Felix	Bang Chan; Changbin; Han; Hyunjin; Lee Know; Seungmin; I.N; Felix	SKZ2021	2021	
"Call"	Stray Kids	Han; KM-Markit (Note: Contributed in the Japanese version of the song)	Han; Bang Chan	Scars" / "Thunderous" (Japanese ver.)	2021	
"Case 143" † ⁂	Stary Kids	Bang Chan; Changbin; Han	Bang Chan; Changbin; Han; Raphael (Producing Lab); Daviid (3Scape); Yosia (3Scape)	Maxident; The Sound (Note: The Japanese ver. was included in this album in 2023)	2022	
"Charmer"	Stray Kids	Bang Chan; Changbin; Han	Bang Chan; Changbin; Han; Versachoi	Oddinary	2022	
"Cheese"	Stray Kids	Bang Chan; Changbin; Han	Bang Chan; Changbin; Han; Versachoi	Noeasy	2021	
"Chill" (식혀) ⁂	Stray Kids	Bang Chan; Han	Han; Bang Chan	Maxident; The Sound	2022	
"Chk Chk Boom" † ⁂	Stray Kids	Bang Chan; Changbin; Han	Bang Chan; Changbin; Han; Dallas Koehlke; Ronnie Icon; BB Elliot	Ate; Giant	2024	
"Christmas EveL" †	Stray Kids	Bang Chan; Changbin; Han	Bang Chan; Changbin; Han; HotSauce	Christmas EveL	2021	
"Chronosaurus"	Stray Kids	Bang Chan; Changbin; Han	Bang Chan; Changbin; Han; Kairos; SamUIL	Clé 1: Miroh	2019	
"Circus" †	Stray Kids	Bang Chan; Changbin; Han; KM Markit	Bang Chan; Changbin; Han; Earattack; Chan's (Take a Chance)	Circus	2022	
"Circus" (Korean version)	Stray Kids	Bang Chan; Changbin; Han	Bang Chan; Changbin; Han; Earattack; Chan's (Take a Chance)	Maxident	2022	
"Close" ‡ #	Han	Han	Han; Bang Chan	SKZ-Replay	2020	
"Collision" (충돌) ‡	Stray Kids	Han	Han; Millionboy	5-Star	2023	
"Comflex"	Stray Kids	Bang Chan; Changbin; Han	Bang Chan; Changbin; Han; Millionboy	Rock-Star	2023	
"District 9" †	Stray Kids	Bang Chan; Changbin; Han	Bang Chan; Changbin; Han; Trippy	I Am Not; Unveil Stray Kids	2018	
"Domino"	Stray Kids	Bang Chan; Changbin; Han	Bang Chan; Changbin; Han; Versachoi	Noeasy; Christmas EveL (Note: The English ver. was included in this album.)	2021	
"Don't Say" ‡ #	Han	Han	Versachoi; Bang Chan; Han	Unreleased song	2023	
"Double Knot" † ⁂	Stray Kids	Bang Chan; Changbin; Han	Bang Chan; Changbin; Han; Nick Furlong; DallasK	Clé: Levanter (Note: previously released by pre-debut 3Racha in 2017); Step Out of Clé (Note: The English version was released in this album); SKZ2020 (Note: The Japanese ver. was released in this album)	2019	
"Easy"	Stray Kids	Bang Chan; Changbin; Han	Bang Chan; Changbin; Han; Mike Daley; Mike J Henry Oyekanmi; Mitchell Owens	Go Live	2020	
"Fairytale"	Stray Kids	Han; KM-Markit	Han; Millionboy	Circus	2022	
"Fam"	Stray Kids	Bang Chan; Changbin; Han; KM-Markit	Bang Chan; Changbin; Han; Versachoi	All In	2020	
"Fam" (Korean version) #	Stray Kids	Bang Chan; Changbin; Han	Bang Chan; Changbin; Han; Versachoi	Non-album single (Note: STRAY KIDS 2ND WORLD SEOUL SPECIAL UNVEIL 11)	2022	
"For You"	Stray Kids	Bang Chan; Changbin; Han; Hyunjin; Lee Know; Seungmin; I.N; Felix	Bang Chan; Changbin; Han; Hyunjin; Lee Know; Seungmin; I.N; Felix	SKZ2021	2021	
"Freeze" (땡)	Stray Kids	Bang Chan; Changbin; Han	Bang Chan; Changbin; Han; Trippy	Oddinary	2022	
"Get Cool"	Stray Kids	Inner Child; Bang Chan; Changbin; Han	Yoon Jong-sung (MonoTree); Inner Child (MonoTree); Song Ha-eun; Totem; Bang Chan; Changbin; Han	I Am You; Unveil Stray Kids	2018	
"Get Lit" (준어보자) ‡	Stray Kids	Han	Han; Chae Gang-hae; Restart	5-Star	2023	
"Giant" †	Stray Kids	Bang Chan; Changbin; Han; Yohei	Bang Chan; Changbin; Han; Restart; Chae Kang-hae	Giant	2024	
"Give Me Your TMI"	Stray Kids	Bang Chan; Changbin; Han	Bang Chan; Changbin; Han; Tak; 1Take	Maxident	2022	
"Go Live" (GO生)	Stray Kids	Bang Chan; Changbin; Han	Bang Chan; Changbin; Han; Amanda MNDR Warner; Peter Wade Keusch	Go Live	2020	
"God's Menu" (神메뉴; 神メニュー) † ⁂	Stray Kids	Bang Chan; Changbin; Han	Bang Chan; Changbin; Han; Versachoi	Go Live; All In (Note: The Japanese version was included in this album)	2020	
"Gone Away"	Han, Seungmin, I.N	Han; Seungmin; I.N	Han; Seungmin; I.N; Armadillo; Gump	Noeasy	2021	
"Grow Up"	Stray Kids	Bang Chan; Changbin; Han	Bang Chan; Changbin; Han; Trippy	I Am Not; Unveil Stray Kids	2018	
"Grr" (총량의법칙)	Stray Kids	Bang Chan; Changbin; Han	Bang Chan; Changbin; Han; Armadillo; Trippy; 1Take	Mixtape	2018	
"Hall of Fame" (위인전)	Stray Kids	Bang Chan; Changbin; Han	Bang Chan; Changbin; Han; Versachoi	5-Star	2023	
"Happy" ‡ #	Han	Han	Han; Bang Chan	SKZ-Replay	2021	
"Hellevator" †	Stray Kids	Armadilo; Bang Chan; Changbin; Han	Armadillo; Bang Chan; Changbin; Han; Rangga	Mixtape; Unveil Stray Kids	2017	
"Hello Stranger"	Stray Kids	Bang Chan; Changbin; Han	Bang Chan; Changbin; Han; Hong Ji-sang	Pop Out Boy! OST Part 1	2020	
"Hero's Soup" (해장국)	Stray Kids	Bang Chan; Changbin; Han	Bang Chan; Changbin; Han; Lee Hae-sol	I Am You	2018	
"Heyday" (Prod. Czaer)	3Racha	Bang Chan; Changbin; Han	Czaer; MarkAlong; Stephen Lee; Bashment YC; Owo; Bang Chan; Changbin; Han	Street Man Fighter Original Vol. 4 (Crew Songs)	2022	
"Hold My Hand" ‡	Han	Han	Han; Helixx	Hop	2024	
"Hold On" ‡ #	Seungmin	Han	Han; Bang Chan; Versachoi	SKZ-Record track	2023	
"Human" (사람이니까) ‡	Han	Han	Han; Neut	SKZ-Record track	2024	
"Hoodie Season"	Stray Kids	Bang Chan; Changbin; Han; Hyunjin; Lee Know eungmin I.N; Felix	Bang Chan; Changbin; Han; Hyunjin; Lee Know eungmin I.N; Felix	SKZ2021	2021	
"I Am You" †	Stray Kids	Bang Chan; Changbin; Han	Bang Chan; Changbin; Han; Lee Woo-min "Collapsedone"; Justin Reinstein; KZ; Zene The Zilla	I Am You; Unveil Stray Kids	2018	
"I Got It" ‡ #	Han	Han	Han; Bang Chan	SKZ-Replay	2020	
"I Like It"	Stray Kids	Bang Chan; Changbin; Han; JBach	Bang Chan; Changbin; Han; Nathan Cunningham; Marc Sibley; JBach	Ate	2024	
"Ice Americano" #	Lee Know, Han	Lee Know; Han	Lee Know; Han; Bang Chan	SKZ-Record track	2020	
"Insomnia" (불면증)	Stray Kids	Bang Chan; Changbin; Han	Bang Chan; Changbin; Han; KZ; Space One	I Am Who	2018	
"Item"	Stray Kids	Bang Chan; Changbin; Han	Bang Chan; Changbin; Han; Versachoi	5-Star	2023	
"Just Breathe" †	Sky-Hi, 3Racha	Bang Chan; Changbin; Han; Sky-Hi	Bang Chan; Changbin; Han; Sky-Hi	The Debut	2022	
"Lalalala" (락 (樂)) †	Stray Kids	Bang Chan; Changbin; Han	Bang Chan; Changbin; Han; Versachoi; Kevin Gomringer; Tim Gomringer; Luis Bacque	Rock-Star	2023	
"Lalalala" (Rock version)	Stray Kids	Bang Chan; Changbin; Han	Bang Chan; Changbin; Han; Versachoi; Kevin Gomringer; Tim Gomringer; Luis Bacque	Rock-Star	2023	
"Levanter" †	Stray Kids	Bang Chan; Changbin; Han; JYP; Herz Analog	Bang Chan; Changbin; Han; Hong Ji-sang	Clé: Levanter; Step Out of Clé (Note: The English ver. was included in this album); SKZ2020 (Note: The Japanese ver. was included in this album)	2019	
"Lose My Breath" ((featuring Charlie Puth) version) †	Stray Kids & Charlie Puth	Bang Chan; Changbin; Han; Hindlin Jacob Kasher; Charlie Puth; Salomon Naliya	Charlie Puth; Bang Chan; Changbin; Han; Johnny Goldstein	Non-album single	2024	
"Lose My Breath" (Stray Kids version)†	Stray Kids	Bang Chan; Changbin; Han; Hindlin Jacob Kasher; Charlie Puth; Salomon Naliya	Charlie Puth; Bang Chan; Changbin; Han; Johnny Goldstein	Non-album single	2024	
"M.I.A."	Stray Kids	Bang Chan; Changbin; Han	Bang Chan; Changbin; Han; Kim Mong-e	I Am Who	2018	
"Maniac" † ⁂	Stray Kids	Bang Chan; Changbin; Han	Bang Chan; Changbin; Han; Versachoi	Oddinary; Circus (Note: The Japanese ver. was released in this album)	2022	
"Matryoshka" #	3Racha	Bang Chan; Changbin; Han	Bang Chan; Changbin; Han	Non-album single (Note: Performed during Stray Kids reality show Ep. 6)	2017	
"Maybe" ‡ #	Han	Han	Neut; Han	SKZ-Record track	2024	
"Maze of Memories" (잠깐의 고요)	Stray Kids	Bang Chan; Changbin; Han	Bang Chan; Changbin; Han; J;Key	Clé 1: Miroh	2019	
"Megaverse"	Stray Kids	Bang Chan; Changbin; Han	Bang Chan; Changbin; Han; Versachoi	Rock-Star	2023	
"Miroh" †	Stray Kids	Bang Chan; Changbin; Han	Bang Chan; Changbin; Han; Brian Atwood	Clé 1: Miroh; Unveil Stray Kids	2019	
"Mirror"	Stray Kids	Bang Chan; Changbin; Han	Bang Chan; Changbin; Han; Lee Woo-min "Collapsedone"; Fredrik "Fredro" Ödesjö	I Am Not	2018	
"Miserable (You & Me)" ‡ #	Han	Han	Han; Chan's	SKZ-Record track	2023	
"Mixtape#1"	Stray Kids	Bang Chan; Changbin; Han; Hyunjin; Lee Know; Seungmin; I.N; Felix; Woojin	Bang Chan; Changbin; Han; Hyunjin; Lee Know; Seungmin; I.N; Felix; Woojin	I Am Not; Clé 2: Yellow Wood (Note: Later was included in the album in 2019.)	2018	
"Mixtape#2"	Stray Kids	Bang Chan; Changbin; Han; Hyunjin; Lee Know; Seungmin; I.N; Felix; Woojin	Bang Chan; Changbin; Han; Hyunjin; Lee Know; Seungmin; I.N; Felix; Woojin	I Am Who; Clé 2: Yellow Wood (Note: Later was included in this album in 2019.)	2018	
"Mixtape#3"	Stray Kids	Bang Chan; Changbin; Han; Hyunjin; Lee Know; Seungmin; I.N; Felix; Woojin	Bang Chan; Changbin; Han; Hyunjin; Lee Know; Seungmin; I.N; Felix; Woojin	I Am You; Clé 2: Yellow Wood (Note: Later was included in this album in 2019.)	2018	
"Mixtape#4"	Stray Kids	Bang Chan; Changbin; Han; Hyunjin; Lee Know; Seungmin; I.N; Felix; Woojin	Bang Chan; Changbin; Han; Hyunjin; Lee Know; Seungmin; I.N; Felix; Woojin	Clé 1: Miroh; Clé 2: Yellow Wood (Note: Later was included in this album in 2019.)	2019	
"Mixtape#5"	Stray Kids	Bang Chan; Changbin; Han; Hyunjin; Lee Know; Seungmin; I.N; Felix; Woojin	Bang Chan; Changbin; Han; Hyunjin; Lee Know; Seungmin; I.N; Felix	Clé: Levanter	2019	
"Mixtape: Oh" (애) †	Stray Kids	Bang Chan; Changbin; Han	Bang Chan; Changbin; Han; Kobee; Holy M	Non-album single (Note: Later was included in the album Noeasy)	2021	
"Mixtape: Time Out" †	Stray Kids	Bang Chan; Changbin; Han	Bang Chan; Changbin; Han; Versachoi; Jun2	Non-album single (Note: Released on YouTube and YouTube Music only in 2022, but later got included in Stray Kids' 5-Star album)	2022	
"Mountains"	Stray Kids	Bang Chan; Changbin; Han	Bang Chan; Changbin; Han; Versachoi	Ate	2024	
"Muddy Water"	Changbin, Hyunjin, Han, Felix	Changbin; Hyunjin; Han; Felix	Changbin; Hyunjin; Han; Felix; Millionboy	Oddinary	2022	
"My Pace" † ⁂	Stray Kids	Bang Chan; Changbin; Han; JYP	Bang Chan; Changbin; Han; Earattack; Larmook	I Am Who; Unveil Stray Kids; SKZ2020 (Note: The Japanese ver. was included in this album)	2018	
"My Side" (편)	Stray Kids	Bang Chan; Changbin; Han	Bang Chan; Changbin; Han; Frants	I Am You	2018	
"N/S" (극과 극)	Stray Kids	Bang Chan; Changbin; Han	Bang Chan; Changbin; Han; Slo	I Am You	2018	
"Nevermind"	Yao Chen	Blazo	Bang Chan; Changbin; Han	Non-album single	2021	
"Night"	Stray Kids	Bang Chan; Changbin; Han; D&H (Purple Night)	Bang Chan; Changbin; Han; Versachoi	Giant (Note: This song was also used as the opening theme song for Tower of God season 2)	2024	
"Night" (Korean version) †	Stray Kids	Bang Chan; Changbin; Han	Bang Chan; Changbin; Han; Versachoi	Tower of God Season 2 Battle OST	2024	
"Night" (English version)	Stray Kids	Bang Chan; Changbin; Han	Bang Chan; Changbin; Han; Versachoi	Giant	2024	
"Pacemaker"	Stray Kids	Bang Chan; Changbin; Han; Jinli (Full8loom)	Bang Chan; Changbin; Han; Jinri (Full8loom); Glory Face (Full8loom); Jake (ARTiffect)	Go Live	2020	
"Paradise"	NiziU	Bang Chan; Changbin; Han; Akira	Bang Chan; Changbin; Han	Doraemon: Nobita's Sky Utopia; Coconut	2023	
"Paradise" (Korean version)	NiziU	Bang Chan; Changbin; Han; Akira	Bang Chan; Changbin; Han	Press Play	2023	
"Phobia"	Stray Kids	Bang Chan; Versa Choi; Changbin; Han	Versachoi; Albin Nordqvist	Go Live	2020	
"Placebo"	Stray Kids	Bang Chan; Changbin; Han; Hyunjin; Lee Know; Seungmin; I.N; Felix	Bang Chan; Changbin; Han; Hyunjin; Lee Know; Seungmin; I.N; Felix	SKZ2021	2021	
"Playing with Colours" (물감놀이)	3Racha, Lee Min-hyuk, Hongjoong	Lee Min-hyuk; Bang Chan; Changbin; Han; Hong-joong	Lee Min-hyuk; Bang Chan; Changbin; Han; Hong-joong	Non-album single (Note: Performed during Kingdom: Legendary War Round 1 Part.1)	2021	
"Question"	Stray Kids	Bang Chan; Changbin; Han	Bang Chan; Changbin; Han; HotSauce	I Am Who	2018	
"Raining Stars" (유성우) ‡ #	Han	Han	Han; Helixx (Vendors)	SKZ-Record track	2025	
"Respirator" (산소호흡기) #	Han; Seungmin	Han; Seungmin	Han; Seungmin; MarkAlong (AdeMade); KKannu (AdeMade)	SKZ-Record track	2024	
"Road Not Taken"(밟힌 적 없는 길)	Stray Kids	Bang Chan; Changbin; Han	Matthew Tishler; Andrew; Underberg; Crash Cove	Clé 2: Yellow Wood	2019	
"Rock" (돌)	Stray Kids	Bang Chan; Changbin; Han	Bang Chan; Changbin; Han; Glory Face (Full8loom)	I Am Not	2018	
"Run" ‡	Han	Han	Han; Bang Chan	SKZ-Replay	2022	
"Runner's High"	3Racha	Bang Chan; Changbin; Han	Bang Chan; Changbin; Han	Non-album single (Note: Performed during Stray Kids reality show Ep. 1)	2017	
"Saiyan"	Stray Kids	Bang Chan, Han, KM-Markit	Han; Bang Chan; Versachoi	Giant	2024	
"Scars" (Japanese version)	Stray Kids	Bang Chan; Changbin; Han; KM Markit	Armadillo; Bang Chan; Changbin; Han	The Sound	2021	
"Scars" (Korean version) †	Stray Kids	Bang Chan; Changbin; Han	Armadillo; Bang Chan; Changbin; Han	SKZ2021	2021	
"School Life"	Stray Kids	Lim Jeong-seok; Bang Chan; Changbin; Han; Woojin; I.N	Brandon P. Lowry; Tobias Karlsson; Matthew Engst; Han; Woojin; Sangmi Kim	Mixtape	2018	
"Secret Secret" (말할 수 없는 비밀) ‡	Stray Kids	Han	JinbyJin; Han; Moa "Cazzi Opeia" Carlebecker; Gabriel Brandes	Noeasy	2021	
"S-Class" †	Stray Kids	Bang Chan; Changbin; Han	Bang Chan; Changbin; Han; Chae Gang-hae; Restart	5-Star	2023	
"Side Effects" †	Stray Kids	Bang Chan; Changbin; Han	Bang Chan; Changbin; Han; Tak; 1Take	Clé 2: Yellow Wood; Unveil Stray Kids	2019	
"Silent Cry" ⁂	Stray Kids	Bang Chan; Changbin; Han	Bang Chan; Changbin; Han; Hong Ji-sang	Noeasy; Circus (Note: Later the Japanese ver. was included in this album in 2022.)	2021	
"SKZ Anthem" #	Stray Kids	Bang Chan; Changbin; Han	Bang Chan; Changbin; Han	Non-album single (Note: Opening anthem for Stray Kids concerts from 2018 until 2023)	2018	
"Slash"	Stray Kids	Bang Chan; Changbin; Han	Bang Chan; Changbin; Han; Versachoi	Deadpool & Wolverine	2024	
"Slump"	Stray Kids	Han (KM-Markit) (Note: Contributed only in the Japanese version of the song); Bang Chan (Note: Contributed only in the English version of the song); Sophia Pae (Note: Contributed only in the English version of the song)	Han; Bang Chan	Go Live; All In; Tower of God ED	2020	
"Social Path" (Featuring Lisa) †	Stray Kids and Lisa	Bang Chan; Changbin; Han; Yohei	Bang Chan; Changbin; Han; Versachoi	Social Path / Super Bowl (Japanese Ver.)	2023	
"Social Path" (Korean version featuring Lisa)	Stray Kids and Lisa	Bang Chan; Changbin; Han	Bang Chan; Changbin; Han; Versachoi	Rock-Star	2023	
"The Sound" †	Stray Kids	Bang Chan; Changbin; Han; D&H; Chris Larocca	Bang Chan; Changbin; Han; Zack Djurich; Kyle Reynolds; Chris LaRocca	The Sound	2023	
"The Sound" (Korean version)	Stray Kids	Bang Chan; Changbin; Han	Bang Chan; Changbin; Han; Zack Djurich; Kyle Reynolds; Chris LaRocca	5-Star	2023	
"Spread My Wings" (어린 날개)	Stray Kids	Bang Chan; Changbin; Han	Bang Chan; Changbin; Han; Trippy	Mixtape	2018	
"Ssick"	Stray Kids	Bang Chan; Changbin; Han	Bang Chan; Changbin; Han; ByHVN (153/Joombas)	Noeasy	2021	
"Star Lost"	Stray Kids	Bang Chan; Changbin; Han; Kalos; Earattack	Earattack; DaviDior	Noeasy	2021	
"Stop"	Stray Kids	Bang Chan; Changbin; Han	Bang Chan; Changbin; Han; Matthew Tishler; Andrew Underberg; Crash Cove	Clé: Levanter	2019	
"Stray Kids"	Stray Kids	Bang Chan; Changbin; Han	Bang Chan; Changbin; Han; DallasK; Ronnie Icon	Ate	2024	
"Sunshine" ‡	Stray Kids	Han	Han; Nick Lee; Josh Wei	Clé: Levanter	2019	
"Super Board"	Stray Kids	Bang Chan; Changbin; Han	Bang Chan; Changbin; Han; Kim Park Chella	Maxident	2022	
"Super Bowl" † ⁂	Stray Kids	Bang Chan; Changbin; Han; Felix	Bang Chan; Changbin; Han; Zack Djurich	5-Star; Social Path / Super Bowl (Japanese Ver.)	2023	
"Ta" (타)	Stray Kids	Bang Chan; Changbin; Han	Bang Chan; Changbin; Han; Lee Hae-sol	Go Live	2020	
"Thunderous" † ⁂	Stray Kids	Bang Chan; Changbin; Han	Bang Chan; Changbin; Han; HotSauce	Noeasy; The Sound	2021	
"TMT" (별생각)	Stray Kids	Bang Chan; Changbin; Han	Bang Chan; Changbin; Han; Time; Gravvity	Clé 2: Yellow Wood	2019	
"Top" †	Stray Kids	Armadillo; Bang Chan; Changbin; Han; KM Markit	Armadillo; Bang Chan; Changbin; Han; Rangga; Gwon Yeong-chan	All In (Note: The Japanese version was included in this EP and the English ver. was released as a single on May 20, 2020.)	2020	
"Top" (Korean version) †	Stray Kids	Armadillo; Bang Chan; Changbin; Han; KM Markit	Armadillo; Bang Chan; Changbin; Han; Rangga; Gwon Yeong-chan	Tower of God OST; Go Live	2020	
"Topline" (featuring Tiger JK)	Stray Kids, Tiger JK	Bang Chan; Changbin; Han; Tiger JK	Bang Chan; Changbin; Han; Versachoi	5-Star	2023	
"The Tortoise and the Hare"	Stray Kids	Bang Chan; Changbin; Han	Bang Chan; Changbin; Han; Amanda MNDR Warner; Peter Wade Keusch	In Life	2020	
"Twilight" (또 다시 밤) ‡	Stray Kids	Han	Han; Restart; Chae Gang-hae	Ate	2024	
"U" featuring Tablo	Stray Kids and Tablo	Bang Chan; Changbin; Han; Tablo; JBach	Bang Chan; Changbin; Han; JBach; Marc Sibley; Nathan Cunningham	Hop	2024	
"Venom" (거미줄) ⁂	Stray Kids	Bang Chan; Changbin; Han	Bang Chan; Changbin; Han; DallasK	Oddinary; Circus	2022	
"The View"	Stray Kids	Bang Chan; Changbin; Han; Krysta Youngs	Bang Chan; Changbin; Han; TELYKast; Krysta Youngs	Noeasy	2021	
"Victory Song"	Stray Kids	Bang Chan; Changbin; Han	Bang Chan; Changbin; Han; Earattack; Larmook	Clé 1: Miroh; Unveil Stray Kids	2019	
"Voices"	Stray Kids	Bang Chan; Changbin; Han	Bang Chan; Changbin; Han; Trippy	I Am Who	2019	
"Volcano" ‡ #	Han	Han	Han; Bang Chan	SKZ-Record track	2023	
"Walkin on Water" †	Stray Kids	Bang Chan; Changbin; Han	Bang Chan; Changbin; Han; Restart; Chae Gang-hae	Hop	2024	
"Walkin on Water" (Hip version)	Stray Kids	Bang Chan; Changbin; Han	Bang Chan; Changbin; Han; Restart; Chae Gang-hae	Hop	2024	
"Want So Bad" ‡ #	Lee Know, Han	Han	Han; Chan's	SKZ-Record track	2023	
"We Go"	3Racha	Bang Chan; Changbin; Han	Bang Chan; Changbin; Han; Nick Furlong; DallasK	In Life	2020	
"Who?"	Stray Kids	Woojin; Han; Felix	Woojin; Han; Felix; Hong Ji-sang	I Am Who	2018	
"Why?"	Stray Kids	Bang Chan; Changbin; Han; Yohei, D&H	Bang Chan; Changbin; Han; Hong Ji-sang	Re:Revenge- In the End of Desire OST; Giant	2024	
"Winter Falls" ‡ †	Stray Kids	Han	Han; Earattack	Christmas EveL	2021	
"Wish You Back" ‡ #	Han	Han	Han; Bang Chan	SKZ-Replay	2021	
"Wo De Shi Dai"	Show Lo	Bang Chan; Changbin; Han	Bang Chan; Changbin; Han	No Idea	2019	
"Wolfgang"	Stray Kids	Bang Chan; Changbin; Han	Bang Chan; Changbin; Han; Versachoi	Kingdom: Legendary War (Note: performed in the "Finale: Who Is the King?"); Noeasy	2021	
"Yayaya"	Stray Kids	Bang Chan; Changbin; Han; Ahn Tae Seok	Earattack; Bang Chan; Changbin; Han	Mixtape	2018	
"Yeah" #	3Racha	Bang Chan; Changbin; Han	Bang Chan; Changbin; Han	Non-album single (Note: Performed during KCON 2022 LA)	2022	
"Yolo-Konde"	JO1	JO1	Bang Chan; Changbin; Han	Non-album single	2022	
"You Can Stay"	Stray Kids	Bang Chan; Changbin; Han	Bang Chan; Changbin; Han; Cook Classics	Clé: Levanter	2019	
"Your Eyes" †	Stray Kids	Bang Chan; Changbin; Han; KM Markit	Bang Chan; Changbin; Jun2	Circus	2022	
"Zone" #	Bang Chan, Changbin, Han	Bang Chan; Changbin; Han	Bang Chan; Changbin; Han	SKZ-Replay	2022	

== See also ==
- List of songs recorded by Stray Kids
