= Maxident =

- Digital cover

EP by Stray Kids
- Released: October 7, 2022
- Studios: JYPE (Seoul); Chan's "Room" (Seoul); Jisang's (Seoul)
- Length: 26:40
- Languages: Korean; English
- Labels: JYP; Republic
- Producers: 3Racha; Raphael; Daviid; Yosia; Versachoi; Tak; 1Take; Kim Park Chella; Hong Ji-sang; Earattack; Chan's; Darm

Stray Kids chronology
Circus (2022)	Maxident (2022)	SKZ-Replay (2022)

Singles from Maxident
- 1. "Case 143" Released: October 7, 2022

Maxident is the seventh Korean-language extended play and eleventh overall by South Korean boy band Stray Kids. It was released on October 7, 2022, through JYP Entertainment and Republic Records, seven months after the release of their preceding EP, Oddinary (2022). A portmanteau of "max" or "maximum" and "incident" or "accident", the EP saw the band take on a "love" concept for the first time. The album was written and produced primarily by 3Racha, alongside the group's other members and producers Raphael, Daviid, Yosia, Tak, 1Take, Kim Park Chella, Hong Ji-sang, Earattack, Chan's, and Darm. It consists of eight tracks, including the lead single "Case 143" and the Korean version of "Circus", originally from the band's Japanese EP of the same name.

Music critics described Maxident as an experimental release that still retains Stray Kids' identity. The EP topped national charts in South Korea, Poland, and the United States, and reached the top ten in Australia, Belgium, Denmark, Finland, Hungary, Japan, Lithuania, New Zealand, Sweden, and Switzerland. The EP was certified as a triple-million seller by the Korea Music Content Association (KMCA), making it one of the best-selling albums in South Korea, and won the Album Bonsang at the 37th Golden Disc Awards and the Album of the Year in the fourth quarter at the 12th Circle Chart Music Awards. Maxident was certified gold by Recording Industry Association of America and was the sixth best-selling album worldwide in 2022, according to the International Federation of the Phonographic Industry (IFPI).

== Background and recording ==
Stray Kids revealed in the video "Step Out 2022", uploaded on January 1, 2022, that they would release two albums in 2022 (excluding Japanese-language releases). The first album was the extended play Oddinary, issued on March 18. It earned Stray Kids their first appearance and first number-one album on the United States Billboard 200 album chart with 103,000 copies sold, the biggest weekly sales in the country in 2022 at the time; it also made the band the third Korean act to top the same chart, after BTS and SuperM. From April to July, Stray Kids embarked on their Maniac World Tour in South Korea, Japan, and the United States. While touring, the group released their second Japanese-language EP Circus on June 22. They followed this with the Mixtape Project single "Mixtape: Time Out" on August 1, commemorating the fourth anniversary of the announcement of the fan club's name, "Stay".

The group's second album of 2022, titled Maxident, was announced through a trailer on September 6 and scheduled for release on October 7. The EP's title is a portmanteau of "max" or "maximum" and "accident" or "incident", likening the emotions and feelings of love to a massive, unexpected event. In a Tumblr interview, Stray Kids members stated that the songs from Maxident mostly were inspired by and written during their 2022 tour. Bang Chan revealed in their EP's documentary video, Intro "Maxident", that "Give Me Your TMI" was written between 2019 and 2020. In a Paper interview, 3Racha stated that the band wrote "3Racha" remotely during their quarantine in March 2022, after most members tested positive for COVID-19 during the promotion of Oddinary.

== Music and lyrics ==
The band's previous albums have included mellow and small love songs, but we came to create this song as we needed a bigger one that can make us dance to its tune onstage. […] We pondered a lot to figure out how to express love while staying true to our own images. Now I think it can stand out from other love songs because it used our own straightforward way of expressing love.

— Changbin, introducing Maxident at the press conference

Maxident consists of eight tracks, running for twenty-six minutes and forty seconds. Despite "powerful-energy" previous releases, the EP marked the first time Stray Kids used "love" as the main theme of their work, conveying the feeling and relationships with other people and one's self. 3Racha—an in-house production team of Stray Kids members Bang Chan, Changbin, and Han—wrote and produced most songs on the EP alongside Tak and 1Take of Newtype, Kim Park Chella, Hong Ji-sang, Earattack, Chan's, Darm, and Versachoi (with whom the group has worked previously), as well as with Raphael of Producing Lab and Daviid and Yosia of 3scape for the first time. Besides 3Racha, the other members also participated in writing tracks: Hyunjin, Felix, and Lee Know for "Taste"; and Seungmin and I.N for "Can't Stop" with Hong.

=== Songs ===
Maxident opens with "Case 143", an electro-hop and pop song that likens the confusion one feels when falling in love to an unsolved "case", referencing the number 143, which means "I love you". A lo-fi R&B-pop song featuring saxophone riffs, "Chill" discusses a couple whose relationship has "cooled down" but unsuccessfully attempt to avoid a breakup as they do not want to hurt each other. "Give Me Your TMI" is a glitch hop track with a progressive funk sound driven by guitar riffs and bass. Providing background to "Case 143", the song expresses how one becomes more curious about the person they are interested in. "Super Board" is a darksynth track that creates a "cyberpunk atmosphere" using bass synths and hip-hop drums. Unlike other tracks, the song conveys the uplifting message to never give up, including the sound effect "nyaun".

Tracks five through seven are performed in sub-units. In the drill diss track "3Racha", Bang Chan, Changbin, and Han convey their pride and ambition as the production team 3Racha, such as chart success and friendship in the face of fame. Next is Lee Know, Hyunjin, and Felix's "sensual" R&B track "Taste", which details physical intimacy and describes the "mysterious atmosphere" surrounding two people who struggle with the inability to love, evoking a more mature image than previous tracks. Performed by Seungmin and I.N, the "feel-good" pop rock track "Can't Stop" is about one's heart beating faster when around somebody they like and has a "fresh, honest and heartwarming" teenage school vibe. The EP closes with the Korean version of "Circus", a hip hop-dance song comparing themselves to circus performers.

== Release and promotion ==
A scene from the Maxident trailer in which heart-shaped monsters appear in front of Stray Kids.

On September 6, 2022, Stray Kids uploaded a two-minute-long trailer to announce Maxident. Directed by Lee Hye-sung, the trailer shows the octet wandering freely in several locations of New York City. Piano melodies initially accompany the visuals before the music switches to EDM beats as the subway hurtles across the scene. Concluding on the rooftop, the trailer shows Hyunjin among the other members receiving a mysterious phone call before differently colored heart-shaped monsters, led by a giant pink one, fall from the sky in front of them, and end up at a crime scene. Additional ten-second trailers specific to each member were uploaded on September 7 and 8.

The EP was made available to pre-save and pre-order on the same date as the trailer's release. The CD came in three editions—a limited "Go" version and two standards, "T-Crush" and "Heart". Stray Kids appeared on the digital exclusive and the Collector's Edition Zine covers for Billboard, published on September 8. The track listing of the EP was posted on September 13, confirming "Case 143" as the lead single and including "Circus", originally from their Japanese EP of the same name, recorded in Korean. Stray Kids held the "Seoul Special (Unveil 11)" shows on September 17 and 18 at KSPO Dome as part of the Maniac World Tour. They gave the debut performances of three sub-unit tracks from the EP—"3Racha", "Taste", and "Can't Stop"—along with the Korean version of "Circus". A mashup video providing sneak peeks of all tracks also premiered at the shows and was uploaded to the group's social media afterward.

Between September 23 and October 2, Stray Kids teased six tracks from EP via snippet videos called "Unveil: Track", consisting of "Super Board", "Chill", the three sub-unit tracks, and "Give Me Your TMI". A series of teaser photos were also teased in three concepts. The first depicts Stray Kids in the car wash filled with soap foam. The second shows the members wearing sailor-esque costumes with a sailboat outdoors. In the third, solo photos express the members posing with different heart-shaped objects, while the group sits on a floor scattered with red heart stickers. Two music videos and one performance video teasers for "Case 143" were uploaded from October 3 to 5. The same day as the release, Stray Kids uploaded the documentary video called Intro "Maxident" and held an online press conference in Seoul to introduce the EP.

Maxident was released on October 7, 2022, in conjunction with an accompanying music video for the lead single "Case 143", directed by 725 of SL8. Four exclusive digital EPs, containing two of eight members' voice memos per version, were issued only in the United States for a limited time on October 11, with the individual "Case" versions released three days later. The "Case 143" performance video followed the next day. Accompanying music videos for the tracks "Super Board", "Chill", and "Give Me Yout TMI" were uploaded on October 17, 21, and 26, respectively.

The group hosted the third season of M2's reality program Finding SKZ, titled Finding SKZ Get Edition, which premiered from October 13 to 27 for three episodes. From the release date to October 23, the group promoted the EP and its lead single "Case 143" at several South Korean music shows, such as Music Bank, Show! Music Core, Inkigayo, Show Champion, and M Countdown. In addition, on October 8, they performed the lead single at Music Universe K-909, alongside the sub-unit tracks; and the 2022 The Fact Music Awards, along with "Maniac". "Super Board" was performed for the first time at the 37th Golden Disc Awards on January 7, 2023.

== Critical reception ==
Professional ratings
Review scores
Source	Rating
AllMusic	4/5 stars
NME	4/5 stars

Upon its release, Maxident received positive reviews from music critics. Crystal Bell from Teen Vogue described Maxident as being "about love, but it's still characteristically Stray Kids." She also stated that the album is an "eclectic", and "experimental" release. Rhian Daly of NME gave the EP four out of five stars, and wrote that it "explores romance deeply for the first time, but doesn't compromise Stray Kids' unique musical DNA in the process" and "should have no problem in furthering the reputation they've been building for themselves." She also praised the group as "true experimenters and artists showing their thrilling progression in real-time."

Billboard writer Jeff Benjamin described the tracks from the EP as not "gushy, catchy love songs, but quirky and unorthodox explorations into all things' connection." Writing for The Straits Times, Jan Lee opined that with Maxident, the group "explore[s] the theme of love. But instead of fluffy feel-good love songs or emotional ballads, they opt for an eclectic mix of sounds", and praised "Give Me Your TMI" for doing "a good job blending the intense raps with the more melodic chorus." AllMusic critic Neil Z. Young gave Maxident four out of five stars, noting that it "features all the band's typical hallmarks, blending edgy raps with smooth harmonies, aggressive electro-production, and popping dance urgency." Squib from Idology identified the EP as "less strength, but more solid". Maxident was named amongst the best albums of the year by Consequence (38), The Honey Pop, and PopCrush.

== Accolades ==
List of awards and nominations received by Maxident
Ceremony	Year	Category	Result	Ref.
Asia Artist Awards	2022	Album of the Year (Daesang) (Note: Credited as Stray Kids)	Won	
Asian Pop Music Awards	2022	Best Album of the Year (Overseas)	Nominated	
Circle Chart Music Awards	2023	Artist of the Year – Album Category (4th Quarter)	Won	
Golden Disc Awards	2023	Album Bonsang	Won	
MAMA Awards	2022	Yogibo Album of the Year	Nominated	

== Commercial performance ==
On September 28, 2022, one week before its release, JYP Entertainment reported that Maxident had exceeded 2.24 million copies in pre-order sales, and 2.37 million copies by the day of release, breaking the company's record set by the 1.3 million pre-orders for Stray Kids' previous EP, Oddinary. According to Hanteo Chart, the EP sold 1,308,971 copies on its first day and 2,185,013 copies in its first week, an increase of 154% compared to the 855,021 copies of Oddinary, giving the group their highest first-week sales figures, and the fourth-highest in Hanteo Chart history. Maxident debuted at number one on South Korea's Circle Album Chart in the chart issue dated October 2–8, 2022, selling 1,602,930 copies. It spent three non-consecutive weeks atop the chart and sold 2,748,722 overall copies in its first month. On November 17, JYP Entertainment reported that Maxident surpassed three million copies sold on the Circle Chart, and Korea Music Content Association (KMCA) subsequently certified the EP as such next month. It marked the first album by any of JYP's artists to reach the double-million and triple-million sales mark, and was the second-best-performing album in South Korea in 2022.

In the United States, Maxident opened at the number one spot of the Billboard 200 on the chart issue date of October 22, 2022, giving Stray Kids their second consecutive number-one album in the country after six months and three weeks of Oddinary, and the first and only act to do so that year. The EP also marked the fourth album by a South Korean act to top the chart in 2022 (after their Oddinary, BTS' Proof, and Blackpink's Born Pink) and the fourth non-English-language album in the year to do so (following mostly-Korean Oddinary and Proof, and Bad Bunny's all-Spanish Un Verano Sin Ti) and sixteenth overall. Of 117,000 album-equivalent units, 110,000 were pure sales, consisting of 107,000 CDs and 3,000 digital albums, becoming the fourth-largest sales week of any album in the US in 2022 at that time. The album also earned 7,000 equivalent units from streaming, equaling 9.61 million on-demand streams. Maxident also topped genre-specific World Albums for two consecutive weeks. The entry of Maxident resulted in Stray Kids re-charting on the Artist 100 at number one for a second time, making them the third Korean act to top the chart for multiple weeks, after BTS and Blackpink. In January 2025, the EP received gold certification from Recording Industry Association of America (RIAA).

In Australia, Maxident entered ARIA Albums Chart at number four, becoming their first top-five album and second top-20 entry after Noeasy (2021). The EP debuted at number one on the Polish OLiS album chart for the second time, following Oddinary. Furthermore, the EP also entered the official album charts of Austria, Belgium (both Flanders and Wallonia), Canada, Croatia, Denmark, Finland, France, Germany, Hungary, Japan (both Oricon and Billboard Japan), Lithuania, the Netherlands, New Zealand, Spain, Sweden, Switzerland, and the United Kingdom. On February 24, 2023, the International Federation of the Phonographic Industry (IFPI) reported that Maxident was the sixth best-selling album in 2022, alongside Oddinary, which was fourteenth.

== Track listing ==
Maxident track listing
No.	Title	Lyrics	Music	Arrangement	Length
1.	"Case 143"	Bang Chan (3Racha); Changbin (3Racha); Han (3Racha)	Bang Chan; Changbin; Han; Raphael (Producing Lab); Daviid (3scape); Yosia (3scape)	Raphael; Daviid; Yosia; Bang Chan	3:12
2.	"Chill" (식혀)	Han	Han; Bang Chan	Versachoi; Bang Chan	3:15
3.	"Give Me Your TMI"	Bang Chan; Changbin; Han	Bang Chan; Changbin; Han; Tak (Newtype); 1Take (Newtype)	Tak; 1Take	3:18
4.	"Super Board"	Bang Chan; Changbin; Han	Bang Chan; Changbin; Han; Kim Park Chella	Kim Park Chella; Bang Chan	3:06
5.	"3Racha" (Bang Chan, Changbin, Han)	Bang Chan; Changbin; Han	Bang Chan; Changbin; Han	Bang Chan; Versachoi	3:29
6.	"Taste" (Lee Know, Hyunjin, Felix)	Hyunjin; Felix; Lee Know	Hyunjin; Felix; Lee Know; Bang Chan	Bang Chan; Versachoi	3:36
7.	"Can't Stop" (나 너 좋아하나봐; Seungmin, I.N)	Seungmin; I.N; Hong Ji-sang	Seungmin; I.N; Hong Ji-sang	Hong Ji-sang	3:30
8.	"Circus" (Korean version)	Bang Chan; Changbin; Han	Bang Chan; Changbin; Han; Earattack; Chan's; Darm	Bang Chan; Earattack; Chan's; Darm	3:14
Total length:					26:40

Exclusive digital bonus track (Bang Chan & Seungmin version)
No.	Title	Lyrics	Length
9.	"Dear Stay – Love, Bang Chan"	Bang Chan	0:55
10.	"Dear Stay – Love, Seungmin"	Seungmin	0:59
Total length:			28:34

Exclusive digital bonus track (Lee Know & Hyunjin version)
No.	Title	Lyrics	Length
9.	"Dear Stay – Love, Lee Know"	Lee Know	0:53
10.	"Dear Stay – Love, Hyunjin"	Hyunjin	0:54
Total length:			28:28

Exclusive digital bonus track (Changbin & Felix version)
No.	Title	Lyrics	Length
9.	"Dear Stay – Love, Changbin"	Changbin	0:53
10.	"Dear Stay – Love, Felix"	Felix	0:51
Total length:			28:24

Exclusive digital bonus track (Han & I.N version)
No.	Title	Lyrics	Length
9.	"Dear Stay – Love, Han"	Han	1:00
10.	"Dear Stay – Love, I.N"	I.N	0:56
Total length:			28:36

Notes

- Track 2 "식혀" (Sikhyeo) means "to cool (down)".
- Track 7 "나 너 좋아하나봐" (Na neo joahanabwa) means "I guess I like you".

== Credits and personnel ==
Musicians

- Stray Kids
  - Bang Chan (3Racha) – vocals (1–5, 8), background vocals (8), synthesizer (2, 4), piano (2), computer programming (5, 6), all instruments (8)
  - Changbin (3Racha) – vocals (1–5, 8), background vocals (8)
  - Han (3Racha) – vocals (1–5, 8), background vocals (8)
  - Lee Know – vocals (1–4, 6, 8), background vocals (8)
  - Hyunjin – vocals (1–4, 6, 8), background vocals (8)
  - Felix – vocals (1–4, 6, 8), background vocals (8)
  - Seungmin – vocals (1–4, 7, 8), background vocals (7, 8)
  - I.N – vocals (1–4, 7, 8), background vocals (7, 8)
- Raphael (Producing Lab) – drum (1), bass guitar (1), synthesizer (1), electric guitar (1), computer programming (1)
- Daviid (3scape) – drum (1), bass (1), synthesizer (1), computer programming (1)
- Yosia (3scape) – piano (1), electric piano (1)
- Versachoi – synthesizer (2, 5, 6), piano (2), bass (2), drum (2), keyboard (5), computer programming (5, 6)
- Tak (Newtype) – electric piano (3), synthesizer (3)
- Kim Park Chella – guitar (4), drum (4), bass (4), synthesizer (4), computer programming (4)
- Hong Ji-sang – synthesizer (7), electric guitar (7), bass (7)
- Earattack – background vocals (8), all instruments (8), computer programming (8), vocal direction (8)
- Chan's – all instruments (8), computer programming (8)
- Darm – all instruments (8), computer programming (8)

Technical

- Lee Kyeong-won – digital editing (1, 4, 6, 8)
- Bang Chan (3Racha) – digital editing (1, 2, 5, 8), recording (1, 2, 4–6)
- 1Take (Newtype) – digital editing (3)
- Eom Se-hee – recording (1)
- Lee Sang-yeop – recording (1, 3)
- Goo Hye-jin – recording (4, 8)
- Hong Ji-sang – recording (7)
- Lee Tae-sub – mixing (1, 7, 8)
- Yoon Won-kwon – mixing (2, 4–6)
- Kim Seok-min – mixing (3)
- Dave Kutch – mastering (1)
- Kwon Nam-woo – mastering (2–8)

Locations

- JYP Publishing (KOMCA) – publishing (all)
- Copyright Control – publishing (1, 4, 8)
- Newtype Ent. – publishing (3)
- JYPE Studios – recording (1, 3, 4, 8), mixing (1, 7, 8)
- Channie's "Room" – recording (1, 2, 4–6)
- Jisang's Studio – recording (7)
- Studio DDeepKick – mixing (2, 4–6)
- Pizza Studio – mixing (3)
- The Mastering Palace – mastering (1)
- 821 Sound Mastering – mastering (2–8)

== Charts ==
=== Weekly charts ===
Weekly chart performance for Maxident
Chart (2022)	Peak position
Australian Albums (ARIA)	4
Austrian Albums (Ö3 Austria)	14
Belgian Albums (Ultratop Flanders)	5
Belgian Albums (Ultratop Wallonia)	5
Canadian Albums (Billboard)	18
Croatian International Albums (HDU)	1
Danish Albums (Hitlisten)	3
Dutch Albums (Album Top 100)	12
Finnish Albums (Suomen virallinen lista)	6
French Albums (SNEP)	99
German Albums (Offizielle Top 100)	73
Hungarian Albums (MAHASZ)	2
Japanese Albums (Oricon)	3
Japanese Combined Albums (Oricon)	3
Japanese Hot Albums (Billboard Japan)	10
Lithuanian Albums (AGATA)	8
New Zealand Albums (RMNZ)	9
Polish Albums (ZPAV)	1
South Korean Albums (Circle)	1
Spanish Albums (Promusicae)	50
Swedish Albums (Sverigetopplistan)	5
Swiss Albums (Schweizer Hitparade)	9
UK Albums (Official Charts)	85
UK Independent Albums (Official Charts)	43
US Billboard 200	1
US World Albums (Billboard)	1

=== Monthly charts ===
Monthly chart performance for Maxident
Chart (2022)	Peak position
Japanese Albums (Oricon)	7
South Korean Albums (Circle)	1

=== Year-end charts ===
2022 year-end chart performance for Maxident
Chart (2022)	Position
Belgian Albums (Ultratop Flanders)	182
Hungarian Albums (MAHASZ)	16
Global Albums (IFPI)	6
Japanese Albums (Oricon)	50
Polish Albums (ZPAV)	97
South Korean Albums (Circle)	2
US Top Album Sales (Billboard)	34
US World Albums (Billboard)	10

2023 year-end chart performance for Maxident
Chart (2023)	Position
Belgian Albums (Ultratop Flanders)	137
Hungarian Albums (MAHASZ)	17
Japanese Albums (Oricon)	93
South Korean Albums (Circle)	61
US Top Album Sales (Billboard)	47
US World Albums (Billboard)	15

2024 year-end chart performance for Maxident
Chart (2024)	Position
Croatian International Albums (HDU)	21

== Certifications and sales ==
Certifications and sales figures for Maxident
Region	Certification	Certified units/sales
Japan Physical	—	104,863
Japan Digital	—	1,938
South Korea (KMCA)	3× Million	3,885,286
United States (RIAA)	Gold	500,000^{‡}
^{‡} Sales+streaming figures based on certification alone.

== Release history ==
Release dates and formats for Maxident
Region	Date	Format	Version	Label	Ref.
Various	October 7, 2022	Digital download; streaming	Digital	JYP; Republic	
South Korea	October 7, 2022	CD	Limited; standard	JYP	
United States	October 7, 2022	CD	Limited; standard	JYP; Republic	
United States	October 11, 2022	Digital download	Exclusive digital	JYP; Republic	
South Korea	October 14, 2022	CD	"Case"	JYP	

== See also ==
- List of best-selling albums in South Korea
- List of Billboard 200 number-one albums of 2022
- List of Circle Album Chart number ones of 2022
- List of number-one albums of 2022 (Poland)
- Lists of fastest-selling albums#South Korea
