= Maniac World Tour =

2022–2023 concert tour by Stray Kids

- World tour by Stray Kids
- Seoul promotional poster
- Location: Asia; North America; Australia
- Associated albums: Oddinary; Circus; Maxident; The Sound
- Start date: April 29, 2022
- End date: April 2, 2023
- No. of shows: 42

Stray Kids concert chronology
- Unlock: Go Live In Life (2020); Maniac World Tour (2022–2023); 5-Star Dome Tour (2023)

The Maniac World Tour, officially Stray Kids 2nd World Tour "Maniac", was the second concert tour by South Korean boy band Stray Kids in support of their 2022 extended plays Oddinary, Circus and Maxident and 2023 album The Sound. The group played 42 shows across Asia, North America, and Australia. The tour began at Jamsil Arena in Seoul on April 29, 2022, and concluded at BMO Stadium in Los Angeles on April 2, 2023. It was the group's first in-person concert tour since District 9: Unlock (2019–2020).

== Background and overview ==
Stray Kids held their first world tour, District 9: Unlock, in 2019 and 2020. It consisted of 24 shows in Asia, the United States, and Europe; however, most shows were eventually canceled or postponed due to the COVID-19 pandemic. On November 22, 2020, the group held their first online concert, Unlock: Go Live In Life, via Beyond Live, which was considered a continuation of District 9: Unlock. On February 13, 2022, Stray Kids announced that their sixth EP Oddinary would be released on March 18. They also announced their second world tour, the Maniac World Tour, after the EP's lead single "Maniac". It was scheduled to begin on April 30 in Seoul, South Korea and visit several cities in Japan and the United States; initially comprising 15 shows, additional shows were to be announced on a later date.

On March 28, the group announced that the Seoul shows would be held at Jamsil Indoor Stadium, adding an additional date in Seoul on April 29, and that the last day of the Seoul shows would be broadcast online via Beyond Live. On April 15, venues in Japan were announced. Additionally, the June 18 and July 27 shows were confirmed to be broadcast at movie theaters in Japan through Live Viewing Japan on the same date as the concerts, alongside airing pay-per-view livestreams of thee June 12 and July 26 shows through Japanese livestream services. The July 27 show was broadcast through Beyond Live outside Japan.

Venues for the American shows were announced on April 18. On April 23, two shows were added—one in Newark and one in Los Angeles—due to overwhelming demand. Three more shows were added in the US afterwards, including one in Seattle and two in Anaheim, on May 4. On July 3, JYP Entertainment announced that members Lee Know, Felix, and I.N, tested positive for COVID-19, causing the shows on July 3 and 6 to be postponed. Prior to the start of the July 12 show, the Oakland Police Department confirmed on Twitter their awareness of threats concerning the group and announced that additional police officers would be present. On July 14, JYP announced that Hyunjin sustained a minor injury to his right hand before the Oakland show and would therefore only be partially participating in the rest of the remaining tour.

On August 5, Stray Kids announced two additional Seoul shows, titled Stray Kids 2nd World Tour "Maniac" Seoul Special (Unveil 11). They were scheduled for September 17 and 18 at KSPO Dome. Songs from their upcoming EP Maxident—"3Racha", "Taste", "Can't Stop", "Circus" (Korean version)—were performed for the first time, as well as "Mixtape: Time Out" and the unreleased Korean version of "Fam" from their Japanese EP All In. On September 29, Stray Kids announced eleven shows in 2023 in Indonesia, Thailand, Singapore, Australia, and Atlanta and Fort Worth (whose original shows were postponed in July due to positive COVID-19 cases). On October 4, Stray Kids added two Melbourne and Sydney shows due to popular demand. On November 4, they announced the two Manila shows for March 11 and 12, 2023, and encore shows in Saitama and Osaka in February and Los Angeles in April.

The video album for Maniac World Tour shows in Seoul was released on DVD on August 8, 2023, and Blu-ray on August 31, and the encore shows in Japan on February 7, 2024.

== Concert synopsis ==
The concert began with the overture "SKZ Anthem". Afterward, Stray Kids appeared onstage in black costumes and spider web-like silver accessories to perform six songs: "Maniac", "Venom", "Red Lights", "Easy", "All In" (Korean version), and "District 9". "Red Lights", initially recorded by Bang Chan and Hyunjin, was performed by the entire group using black cloth hanging from the ceiling. The show continued with the members wearing school uniforms to perform "Back Door", "Charmer", "B Me", "Lonely St.", and "Side Effects". In the second half of the concert, the members wore hanbok to perform "Thunderous", "Domino", and "God's Menu", and continued with "Cheese" and "Yayaya + Rock". All songs in this segment were performed with a live band.

The group then showcased the sub-unit songs from Oddinary. Bang Chan, Lee Know, Seungmin, and I.N performed "Waiting for Us" in pastel outfits with a stand microphone covered in flowers. Changbin, Hyunjin, Han, and Felix sang "Muddy Water" in black leather jackets. In the show's final segment, the members were in white tweed jackets to perform "Silent Cry", "Hellevator", "Double Knot", "Top" and "Victory Song". For the encore, the group appeared in shirts with "Maniac" on them. The first song was different each day—"Astronaut" on day one, "My Pace" on day two, and "Ta" on day three—followed by "Miroh", "Star Lost", and "Haven" to end the show.

== Critical reception ==
Todd Inoue of San Francisco Chronicle praised the concert in Oakland as "a glorious evening of reconnection and restoration," comparing the spider motif onstage to David Bowie's 1987 Glass Spider Tour. Writing for NME, Rhian Daly gave the concert five out of five stars for the first day of Anaheim shows, describing it is "anything but ordinary". Crystal Bell of Teen Vogue called the group's performances "electrifying" and "relentlessly hype", stating that the group's presence "ignited entire arenas, no words needed". Writing for Sanook.com, Jurairat N. praised the concert as "the best K-pop show in Thailand in 2023 so far". The AU Review's Anastasia Giggins gave the Melbourne show four and half out of five stars.

== Accolades ==
List of awards and nominations received by Maniac World Tour (video album)
Ceremony	Year	Category	Result	Ref.
Japan Gold Disc Award	2025	Music Video of the Year (Asia)	Won	

== Set list ==
Set list in Seoul (April 29 – May 1, 2022)

Main set

1. "Maniac"
2. "Venom"
3. "Red Lights" (8-member version)
4. "Easy"
5. "All In" (Korean version)
6. "District 9"
7. "Back Door"
8. "Charmer"
9. "B Me"
10. "Lonely St."
11. "Side Effects"
12. "Thunderous"
13. "Domino"
14. "God's Menu"
15. "Cheese"
16. "Yayaya" + "Rock"
17. "Waiting for Us"
18. "Muddy Water"
19. "Silent Cry"
20. "Hellevator"
21. "Double Knot"
22. "Top"
23. "Victory Song"

Encore

24. "Astronaut" (April 29) / "My Pace" (April 30) / "Ta" (May 1)
25. "Miroh"
26. "Star Lost"
27. "Haven"

Double encore

28. "Boxer" (May 1)
Set list in Japan (June 11–19, July 26–27, 2022)

Main set

1. "Maniac"
2. "Venom"
3. "Red Lights" (8-member version)
4. "Easy"
5. "All In"
6. "District 9"
7. "Back Door"
8. "Charmer"
9. "Lonely St."
10. "Side Effects"
11. "Thunderous"
12. "Domino"
13. "God's Menu"
14. "Cheese"
15. "Yayaya" + "Rock"
16. "Waiting for Us"
17. "Muddy Water"
18. "Circus"
19. "Scars"
20. "Hellevator"
21. "Top" (Japanese version)
22. "Victory Song"

Encore

23. "Fam"
24. "Miroh"
25. "Star Lost"
26. "Haven"
Set list in the United States (June 28 – July 20, 2022)

Main set

1. "Maniac"
2. "Venom"
3. "Red Lights" (8-member version)
4. "Easy"
5. "All In" (Korean version)
6. "District 9"
7. "Back Door"
8. "Charmer"
9. "Lonely St."
10. "Side Effects"
11. "Thunderous"
12. "Domino"
13. "God's Menu"
14. "Cheese"
15. "Yayaya" + "Rock"
16. "Waiting for Us"
17. "Muddy Water"
18. "Scars" (Korean version)
19. "Hellevator"
20. "Top"
21. "Victory Song"

Encore

22. "Ta" (June 28–29) / "My Pace" (otherwise)
23. "Miroh"
24. "Star Lost"
25. "Haven"
Set list in Seoul (September 17–18, 2022)

Main set

1. "Maniac"
2. "Venom"
3. "Red Lights" (8-member version)
4. "Easy"
5. "All In" (Korean version)
6. "District 9"
7. "Back Door"
8. "Charmer"
9. "B Me"
10. "Lonely St."
11. "Side Effects"
12. "Thunderous"
13. "Domino"
14. "God's Menu"
15. "Cheese"
16. "Yayaya" + "Rock"
17. "3Racha"
18. "Taste"
19. "Can't Stop"
20. "Mixtape: Time Out"
21. "Circus" (Korean version)
22. "Hellevator"
23. "Top"
24. "Victory Song"

Encore

25. "Astronaut"
26. "Airplane"
27. "Miroh"
28. "Fam" (Korean version)
29. "Star Lost"
30. "Haven"
Set list in Asia Pacific

Main set

1. "Maniac"
2. "Venom"
3. "Red Lights" (8-member version)
4. "Easy"
5. "All In" (Korean version)
6. "District 9"
7. "Back Door"
8. "Charmer"
9. "Lonely St."
10. "Side Effects"
11. "Thunderous"
12. "Domino"
13. "God's Menu"
14. "Cheese"
15. "Yayaya" + "Rock"
16. "Waiting for Us"
17. "Muddy Water"
18. "Case 143"
19. "Hellevator"
20. "Top"
21. "Victory Song"

Encore

1. "Fam" (Korean version)
2. "Miroh"
3. "Star Lost"
4. "Haven"
Set list in Japan (February 11–12, 25–26, 2023)

Main set

1. "Maniac"
2. "Venom"
3. "Red Lights" (8-member version)
4. "Easy"
5. "All In"
6. "District 9"
7. "Back Door"
8. "Charmer"
9. "Lonely St."
10. "Side Effects"
11. "Thunderous"
12. "Domino"
13. "God's Menu"
14. "Cheese"
15. "Yayaya" + "Rock"
16. "Waiting for Us"
17. "Muddy Water"
18. "The Sound"
19. "Case 143" (Japanese version)
20. "Hellevator"
21. "Top" (Japanese version)
22. "Victory Song"

Encore (February 11–12)

23. "Fairytale"
24. "Blueprint"
25. "Miroh"
26. "Fam"
27. "Star Lost"
28. "Haven"

Encore (February 25–26)

23. "Mixtape: Time Out"
24. "Fairytale"
25. "Circus"
26. "Super Board"
27. "Fam"
28. "Star Lost"
29. "Haven"
30. "Miroh" (February 26 only)
Set list in the United States (March 22 – April 2, 2023)

Main set

1. "Maniac"
2. "Venom"
3. "Red Lights" (8-member version)
4. "Easy"
5. "All In" (Korean version)
6. "District 9"
7. "Back Door"
8. "Charmer"
9. "Lonely St."
10. "Freeze"
11. "Thunderous"
12. "Domino"
13. "God's Menu"
14. "Super Board"
15. "My Pace"
16. "Ta"
17. "Waiting for Us"
18. "Muddy Water"
19. "Case 143"
20. "Hellevator"
21. "Top"
22. "Victory Song"

Encore

23. "Fam" (Korean version)
24. "Miroh"
25. "Mixtape: Time Out" (March 22–27) / "Star Lost" (March 31 – April 2)
26. "Haven"

== Shows ==
List of concerts, showing date, city, country, and venue
Date	City	Country	Venue	Attendance
April 29, 2022	Seoul	South Korea	Jamsil Arena; Beyond Live (Note: May 1 only.)	—
April 30, 2022	Seoul	South Korea	Jamsil Arena; Beyond Live	—
May 1, 2022	Seoul	South Korea	Jamsil Arena; Beyond Live	—
June 11, 2022	Kobe	Japan	World Memorial Hall	—
June 12, 2022	Kobe	Japan	World Memorial Hall	—
June 18, 2022	Tokyo	Japan	Yoyogi National Gymnasium	24,000
June 19, 2022	Tokyo	Japan	Yoyogi National Gymnasium	24,000
June 28, 2022	Newark	United States	Prudential Center	—
June 29, 2022	Newark	United States	Prudential Center	—
July 1, 2022	Chicago	United States	United Center	—
July 9, 2022	Inglewood (Note: Labelled as Los Angeles shows in promotional material, disregarding city boundaries.)	United States	Kia Forum	—
July 10, 2022	Inglewood	United States	Kia Forum	—
July 12, 2022	Oakland	United States	Oakland Arena	—
July 14, 2022	Seattle	United States	Climate Pledge Arena	—
July 15, 2022	Seattle	United States	Climate Pledge Arena	—
July 19, 2022	Anaheim	United States	Honda Center	—
July 20, 2022	Anaheim	United States	Honda Center	—
July 26, 2022	Tokyo	Japan	Yoyogi National Gymnasium; Beyond Live (Note: July 27 only.)	—
July 27, 2022	Tokyo	Japan	Yoyogi National Gymnasium; Beyond Live	—
September 17, 2022	Seoul	South Korea	KSPO Dome	—
September 18, 2022	Seoul	South Korea	KSPO Dome	—
November 12, 2022	Jakarta	Indonesia	Beach City International Stadium	—
November 13, 2022	Jakarta	Indonesia	Beach City International Stadium	—
February 2, 2023	Pak Kret (Note: Labelled as Bangkok shows in promotional material, disregarding city boundaries.)	Thailand	Impact Arena	—
February 3, 2023	Pak Kret	Thailand	Impact Arena	—
February 5, 2023	Singapore		Singapore Indoor Stadium	9,500
February 11, 2023	Saitama (Note: Labelled as Tokyo shows in promotional material, disregarding city boundaries.)	Japan	Saitama Super Arena	40,000
February 12, 2023	Saitama	Japan	Saitama Super Arena	40,000
February 17, 2023	Melbourne	Australia	Rod Laver Arena	—
February 18, 2023	Melbourne	Australia	Rod Laver Arena	—
February 21, 2023	Sydney	Australia	Qudos Bank Arena	—
February 22, 2023	Sydney	Australia	Qudos Bank Arena	—
February 25, 2023	Osaka	Japan	Kyocera Dome Osaka; Beyond Live (Note: February 25 only.)	90,000
February 26, 2023	Osaka	Japan	Kyocera Dome Osaka; Beyond Live	90,000
March 11, 2023	Manila	Philippines	SM Mall of Asia Arena	—
March 12, 2023	Manila	Philippines	SM Mall of Asia Arena	—
March 22, 2023 (Note: This show was originally supposed to take place on July 3, 2022, but postponed to March 22, 2023, due to positive COVID-19 cases.)	Atlanta	United States	State Farm Arena	—
March 23, 2023	Atlanta	United States	State Farm Arena	—
March 26, 2023 (Note: This show was originally supposed to take place on July 6, 2022, but postponed to March 26, 2023, due to positive COVID-19 cases.)	Fort Worth	United States	Dickies Arena	—
March 27, 2023	Fort Worth	United States	Dickies Arena	—
March 31, 2023	Los Angeles	United States	BMO Stadium	—
April 2, 2023	Los Angeles	United States	BMO Stadium	—

== Personnel ==
Stray Kids

- Bang Chan
- Lee Know
- Changbin
- Hyunjin
- Han
- Felix
- Seungmin
- I.N

Band

- Bang In-jae – guitarist
- Kim Seung-ho – drummer
- Ku Bon-am – bassist
- Moon Sang-soon – keyboardist
