= 2022 KBS Song Festival =

South Korean annual music festival

- Official poster
- Also known as: 2022 KBS Gayo Daechukje
- Written by: Noh Jin-yeong; Lee Ji-hye; Yu Ji-hye; Tak Hye-ri; Choi Won-hee; Choi Ju-ae; Kim Young-woong
- Directed by: Bang Geul-yi
- Presented by: Na In-woo; Jang Won-young (Ive); Kim Shin-young
- Starring: Koyote; BoA; Kim Woo-seok (Up10tion); NCT 127; NCT Dream; Pentagon; The Boyz; Fromis 9; Forestella; Stray Kids; (G)I-dle; Ateez; Choi Ye-na; Oneus; Itzy; Tomorrow X Together; STAYC; Aespa; Enhypen; Ive; Kep1er; Nmixx; Le Sserafim; NewJeans

Production
- Producer: Shin Mi-jin
- Production locations: Jamsil Arena; Seoul, South Korea
- Running time: 195 minutes
- Production company: Korean Broadcasting System

Original release
- Network: KBS 2TV; KBS World
- Release: December 16, 2022

The 2022 KBS Song Festival (Korean: KBS 2022 가요대축제) was the 12th edition of KBS Song Festival, broadcast live from Jamsil Arena by KBS 2TV at 8:30 pm KST on Friday, December 16, 2022. A total of 24 teams were invited to the show.

The theme for the year was "Newtro", a transformation aiming to cater to the tastes of all generations. Kim Shin-young, Jang Won-young and Na In-woo hosted the show.

== Background ==
On November 14, KBS announced that Na In-woo, Ive's Jang Won-young, and Kim Shin-young, were selected as MCs for the event. The application for attendance was held from 9:00 am on December 2, 2022.

On November 28, KBS released a graphic poster for the event, which is reminiscent of arcade games, implies that the music festival will have a Y2K theme, a hot trend among K-pop idols this 2022.

On November 30, KBS revealed the line-up, which included Koyote, BoA, Up10tion's Kim Woo-seok, NCT 127, NCT Dream, Pentagon, The Boyz, Fromis 9, Forestella, Stray Kids, (G)I-dle, Ateez, Choi Ye-na, Oneus, Itzy, Tomorrow X Together, STAYC, Aespa, Enhypen, Ive, Kep1er, Nmixx, Le Sserafim, and NewJeans. It was also revealed that the event would be directed by Bang Geul-yi, who directed KBS2's reality-variety show, 2 Days & 1 Night.

== Performances ==
List of musical performances
| Artist(s) | Song(s) |
Part 1
| Koyote All performers | "Genuine" |
| Nmixx | "O.O" "Dice" |
| Kim Woo-seok | "Switch" |
| Kep1er | "Wa Da Da" |
| Oneus | "Same Scent" |
| Akiz (Note: Sullyoon (Nmixx), Leeseo (Ive), Hong Eun-chae (Le Sserafim), Minji, and Hyein (NewJeans)) | "Love Like Oxygen" (Shinee cover) |
| Choi Ye-na | "Smiley" "Smartphone" |
| Oneus (Note: Seoho, Leedo, and Hwanwoong) | "SexyBack" (Justin Timberlake cover) |
| The Boyz (Note: Juyeon, Q, and Sunwoo) | "No Diggity" (Blackstreet cover) |
| STAYC | "Run2U" "Beautiful Monster" |
| Pentagon | "Feelin' Like" |
| NewJeans | "Attention" "Hype Boy" |
Part 2
| Forestella | "Bad Romance" (Lady Gaga cover) |
| Le Sserafim | "Fearless" "Antifragile" |
| Enhypen | "Future Perfect (Pass the Mic)" "ParadoXXX Invasion" |
| Fromis 9 | "Stay This Way" |
| Ateez | "Guerrilla" |
| Y2K Girls (Note: Yuqi ((G)I-dle), Yoon (STAYC), and Liz (Ive)) | "After Breaking Up"(Y2K cover) |
| Aespa | "Girls" |
| Ateez | "T.O.P. (Twinkling of Paradise)" (Shinhwa cover) |
| Le Sserafim | "Hope" (H.O.T. cover) |
| The Boyz | "Whisper" |
| NCT Dream | "Glitch Mode" "Candy" |
Part 3
| Itzy | "Cheshire" "Sneakers" |
| Ive | "Love Dive" "After Like" |
| Tomorrow X Together | "Opening Sequence" "Good Boy Gone Bad" |
| (G)I-dle | "Nxde" "Tomboy" |
| JYP Nation – Hyunjin, Han, Felix (Stray Kids) | "If I Had to Say" (Kim Sung-jae cover) |
| JYP Nation – Ryujin, Chaeryeong (Itzy) | "Caution" (Tashannie cover) |
| JYP Nation – Jiwoo, Kyujin (Nmixx) (Note: Hyunjin, Han, Felix, Ryujin, and Chaeryeong appeared later.) | "You in My Blurred Memories" (Hyun Jin-young cover) |
| Stray Kids | "Case 143" "Maniac" |
| YuWonMi – Jang Won-young (Ive) | "Love" (S.E.S. cover) |
| YuWonMi – Miyeon ((G)I-dle) | "Festival" (Uhm Jung-hwa cover) |
| YuWonMi – Yuna (Itzy) | "U-Go-Girl" (Lee Hyori cover) |
| NCT 127 | "Faster" "2 Baddies" |
| BoA | "Girls on Top" (featuring Taeyong and Jeno) "Forgive Me" |
| BoA All performers | "No.1" (Young 2022 Rock Version) |
