= Maniac (Stray Kids song) =

2022 single by Stray Kids

Single by Stray Kids

from the EP Oddinary
- Language: Korean; English
- Released: March 18, 2022
- Studio: JYPE (Seoul); Channie's "Room" (Seoul)
- Genre: Trap; EDM; pop
- Length: 3:02
- Label: JYP; Republic
- Composers: Bang Chan; Changbin; Han; Versachoi
- Lyricists: Bang Chan; Changbin; Han

Stray Kids singles chronology
| "Christmas EveL" / "Winter Falls" (2021) | "Maniac" (2022) | "Your Eyes" (2022) |

Music video
- "Maniac" on YouTube

"Maniac" is a song recorded by the South Korean boy band Stray Kids. It was the second track released from their sixth Korean extended play (EP), Oddinary, and was its lead single on March 18, 2022, through JYP Entertainment and Republic Records. Written by Stray Kids' in-house production team 3Racha and Versachoi, "Maniac" is a trap, EDM and pop song about "odd" people who break the "ordinary" social norms set by the world, referring to Frankenstein's monster.

Commercially, "Maniac" peaked at number 29 on the South Korean Gaon Digital Chart, and made its first appearance on the US Billboard Bubbling Under Hot 100 at number 19, as well as in Australia, Canada, Portugal and the United Kingdom. The song also debuted at the top of World Digital Song Sales, which is the second song after "Mixtape: Oh". It took two wins from music programs, Show Champion and Music Bank, and was nominated for Best K-Pop Video at the 2022 MTV Video Music Awards. "Maniac" was certified gold by Recording Industry Association of America (RIAA).

== Background and release ==
On February 13, 2022, after the fan meeting 2nd #LoveStay 'SKZ's Chocolate Factory', Stray Kids surprisingly premiered the trailer video for the upcoming EP Oddinary, scheduled for release on March 18. The completed track listing of the EP was posted on March 3, confirming "Maniac" as the lead single. Three music video teasers were uploaded from March 15 to 17. "Maniac" was released alongside the EP, in conjunction with its accompanying music video, According to a Nylon interview, the member Han said that the song was written during fall and winter, and 3Racha want to give off a different vibe from the previous single, "Thunderous". The Japanese version of "Maniac" was pre-released on May 18, through Epic Records Japan and included on the group's Japanese-language second EP Circus, released on June 22.

== Lyrics and composition ==
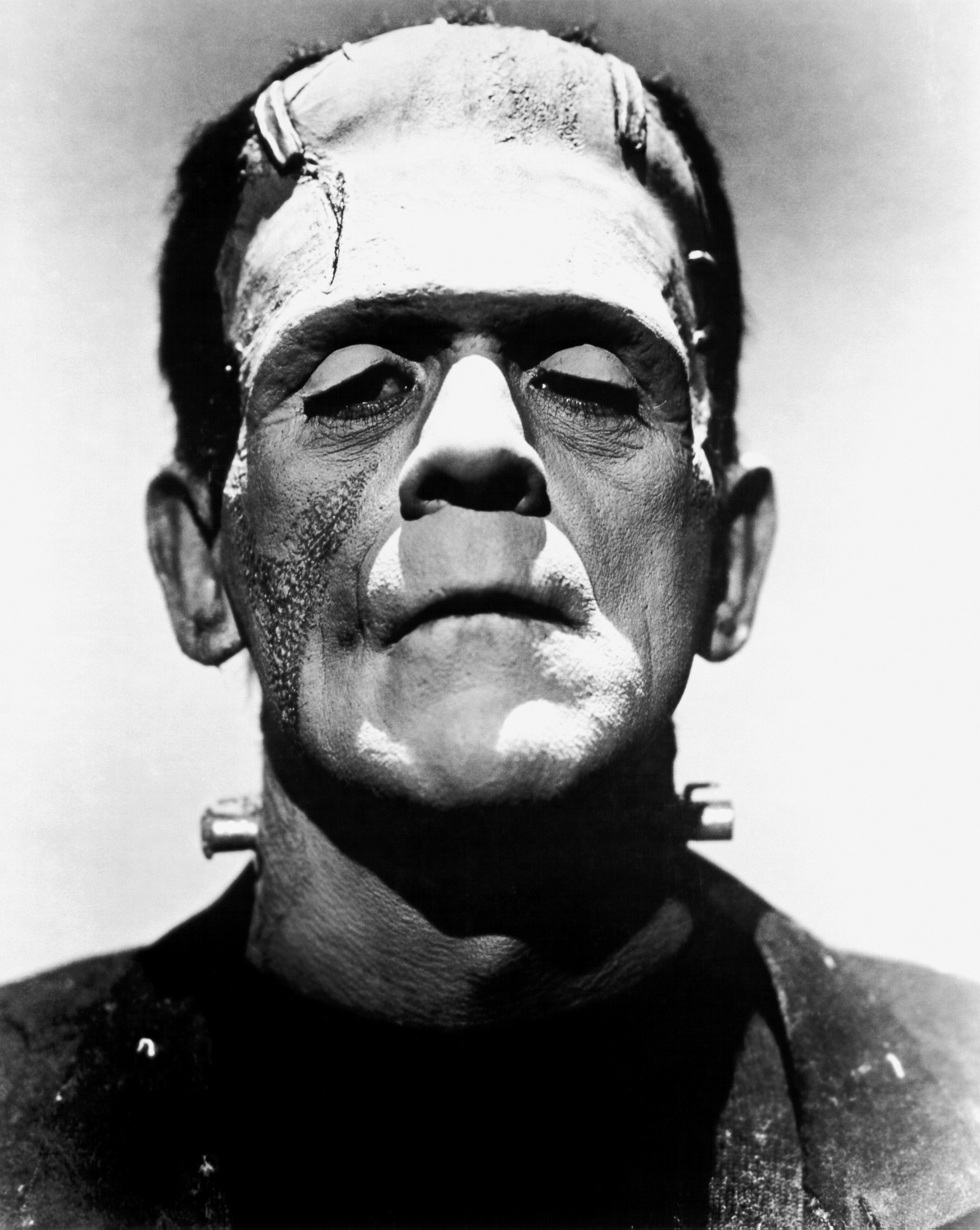
Lyrically, "Maniac" compares "odd" people to Frankenstein (pictured).

"We wrote ["Maniac"] thinking that within this normality, show yourself off as much as you want — show yourself to the world better."

— Han on the meaning of "Maniac", Teen Vogue

"Maniac" is described as a Middle Eastern-influenced "powerful" trap, EDM, pop song, with bass-synth drop, bird-chirping, and drill sounds. It was composed in the key of C♯ major, 120 beats per minute, with a running time of three minutes and two seconds. The song spans from the low note of F♯_{2} by members Hyunjin and Felix, to the high note of F♯_{5} by member Bang Chan. The song was written by Stray Kids' in-house production team 3Racha, consisting of Bang Chan, Changbin, and Han, and co-composed with Versachoi, who also handles the arrangement with Bang Chan. It is 3Racha and Versachoi's second collaboration on the Stray Kids' lead single after "God's Menu" from Go Live (2020). Lyrically, "Maniac" supports the thematic of Oddinary, expressing the story of "odd" people who break the "ordinary" social norms and expectations set by society, comparing them with Frankenstein's monster having a few screws loose.

== Critical reception ==
Teen Vogue's Crystal Bell compared "Maniac" as "proof enough that it doesn't matter which way Stray Kids decide to turn" if Oddinary exists at the crossroads. She praised the group, "can continue to evolve their sound while also staying true to themselves as artists." NME critic, Tássia Assis, admired that "how much Stray Kids refined their talents for this comeback, successfully combining their abrasive energy with more tempered tones." Yemi from Idology said that the song "shows a relatively flexible mood compared to previous works that were consistent with divergence, and it was impressive that the group's unique strong energy was still there, but that they had enough room to try to make rapid adjustments." Rolling Stone ranked "Maniac" number 56 on its list of the Best Songs of 2022. Other publications who ranked it amongst the best K-pop songs of 2022 include Billboard (5th), CNN Philippines Life (5th), The Korea Herald (2nd), NME (24th), and Teen Vogue (unranked).

== Commercial performance ==
In South Korea, "Maniac" debuted at number 105 on the Gaon Digital Chart in the chart issue dated March 13–19, 2022. After that, the song ascended to number 29 in the next week, becoming the group's highest peak on the chart. In Japan, "Maniac" entered Billboard Japan Hot 100 at number 89 and jumped to number 43 in its next week. After the Japanese version release, the song re-entered and peaked at number 21. The song also peaked at number 33 on the Oricon Combined Singles Chart, while the Japanese version at number 28.

In North America, "Maniac" debuted at number 19 on the Billboard Bubbling Under Hot 100, becoming their first appearance on the chart, as well as number one on the World Digital Song Sales, making it the second song to top the chart after "Mixtape: Oh". Later, it received gold certification from Recording Industry Association of America (RIAA) for 500,000 units in May 2024. The song also entered Canadian Hot 100 at number 79. In Europe, "Maniac" appeared for the first time on the main UK Singles Chart at number 98. Globally, the song debuted at number 21 on the Billboard Global 200, as well as number 12 on the Global Excl. U.S., becoming the group's highest-charted song.

== Music video ==
A scene in the music video, where Stray Kids are dancing in an upside-down town.

An accompanying music video for "Maniac was uploaded on March 18, in conjunction with the Oddinary release. Directed by Bang Jae-yeob, the music video oscillates between two worlds, depicting the members exploring various locations of a deserted town in an alternate dimension, and doing random things, such as playing on the subway or cleaning up the diner, and the upside-down version of the town. It also features a giant, graffiti-covered brain, before being transported back to the real world at the end, where the members hold part-time jobs and socialize. Rolling Stone India's Divyansha Dongre compares the two worlds as "Marvel's multiverse meets the Stranger Things' upside-down". The music video reached 50 million views on March 30, and 100 million views on June 22, becoming the sixth music video to reach this milestone following "God's Menu", "Miroh", "Back Door", "My Pace", and "Thunderous".

== Promotion and live performances ==
Stray Kids performed "Maniac" for the first time on March 18, the same date as the release, at Music Bank and The Late Show with Stephen Colbert. However, in that day, JYP Entertainment announced that the promotions had been postponed due to most members, except Felix and I.N, testing positive for COVID-19. On March 26, the label announced that Stray Kids would continue promoting at the music shows beginning at Show Champion on March 30, including M Countdown, Music Bank, Inkigayo, and Show! Music Core. The group also performed "Maniac" at Virtual Gayo Top 10 on March 25, and MTV Fresh Out Live on April 1.

Stray Kids included "Maniac" on the set list of their Maniac World Tour (2022). The group performed the song at Seoul Festa's K-Pop Super Live concert at Seoul Olympic Stadium on August 10, alongside "God's Menu". Stray Kids performed "Maniac" and "Venom" with the theme "Do You Want to Be Oddinary" at 2022 MAMA Awards on November 29. The show depicted a concept of "bizarre laboratory creating eight maniacs" and featured giant spider AR wrapped around the stage. They also performed the song alongside "Case 143" at the 2022 KBS Song Festival on December 16. The group performed the song at Jimmy Kimmel Live! as musical guest on March 29, 2023.

Stray Kids performed the Japanese version at NHK General TV's Venue101 on June 11, broadcast from World Memorial Hall, where the group held the Kobe show of their concert tour, as well as Best Artist 2022 on December 3, alongside "Circus.

== Usage in media ==
"Maniac", alongside "Venom" from the same EP, featured on the fourth episode of American romantic dramedy XO, Kitty.

== Accolades ==
Awards and nominations for "Maniac"
| Ceremony | Year | Award | Result | Ref. |
|---|---|---|---|---|
| Circle Chart Music Awards | 2023 | Artist of the Year – Digital Music Category (March) | Nominated | |
| MAMA Awards | 2022 | Song of the Year | Longlisted | |
| MAMA Awards | 2022 | Best Dance Performance | Nominated | |
| MTV Video Music Awards | 2022 | Best K-Pop | Nominated | |

Music program awards for "Maniac"
| Program | Date | Ref. |
|---|---|---|
| Music Bank | March 25, 2022 | |
| Show Champion | March 30, 2022 | |

== Credits and personnel ==
Credits adapted from Oddinary liner notes.

Locations

- JYP Publishing (KOMCA) – original publishing
- JYPE Studios – recording
- Channie's "Room" – recording
- Larrabee Studios – mixing
- The Mastering Palace – mastering

Personnel

- Stray Kids – vocals
  - Bang Chan (3Racha) – lyrics, composition, arrangement, digital editing, recording
  - Changbin (3Racha) – lyrics, composition
  - Han (3Racha) – lyrics, composition
- Versachoi – composition, arrangement, all instruments, computer programming
- KayOne Lee – digital editing
- Goo Hye-jin – recording
- Manny Marroquin – mixing
- Chris Galland – mix engineering
  - Ramiro Fernandez-Seoane – assistant
- Dave Kutch – mastering

== Charts ==
=== Weekly charts ===
Weekly chart performance for "Maniac"
| Chart (2022) | Peak position |
|---|---|
| Australia (ARIA) | 79 |
| Canada Hot 100 (Billboard) | 79 |
| Global 200 (Billboard) | 21 |
| Hungary (Single Top 40) | 14 |
| Indonesia (Billboard) | 14 |
| Japan Hot 100 (Billboard) | 21 |
| Japan Combined Singles (Oricon) | 33 |
| Lithuania (AGATA) | 41 |
| Malaysia (Billboard) | 2 |
| Malaysia International (RIM) | 4 |
| Netherlands (Dutch Global Top 40) | 21 |
| New Zealand Hot Singles (RMNZ) | 4 |
| Philippines (Billboard) | 22 |
| Portugal (AFP) | 149 |
| Russia (Billboard) | 4 |
| Singapore (RIAS) | 9 |
| South Korea (Gaon) | 29 |
| UK Singles (Official Charts) | 98 |
| UK Indie (Official Charts) | 21 |
| US Bubbling Under Hot 100 (Billboard) | 19 |
| US World Digital Song Sales (Billboard) | 1 |
| Vietnam (Vietnam Hot 100) | 82 |

Weekly chart performance for "Maniac" (Japanese version)
| Chart (2022) | Peak position |
|---|---|
| Japan Combined Singles (Oricon) | 28 |

=== Monthly charts ===
Monthly chart performance for "Maniac"
| Chart (2022) | Position |
|---|---|
| South Korea (Gaon) | 104 |

=== Year-end charts ===
Year-end chart performance for "Maniac"
| Chart (2022) | Position |
|---|---|
| South Korea Download (Circle) | 93 |

== Certifications ==
Certifications for "Maniac"
| Region | Certification | Certified units/sales |
|---|---|---|
| New Zealand (RMNZ) | Gold | 15,000^{‡} |
| United States (RIAA) | Gold | 500,000^{‡} |
Streaming
| Japan (RIAJ) | Platinum | 100,000,000^{†} |
^{‡} Sales+streaming figures based on certification alone.^{†} Streaming-only figures based on certification alone.

== Release history ==
Release dates and formats for "Maniac"
| Region | Date | Format | Version | Label | Ref. |
|---|---|---|---|---|---|
| Various | March 19, 2022 | Digital download; streaming | Original (Korean) | JYP; Republic | |
| Various | May 18, 2022 | Digital download; streaming | Japanese | Epic Japan | |

== See also ==
- List of Music Bank Chart winners (2022)
- List of Show Champion Chart winners (2022)
