= Case 143 =

- Japanese version cover

Single by Stray Kids

from the EP Maxident
- Language: Korean; English
- Released: October 7, 2022
- Studio: JYPE (Seoul); Channie's "Room" (Seoul)
- Genre: Electrohop; pop
- Length: 3:12
- Label: JYP; Republic
- Composers: Bang Chan; Changbin; Han; Raphael; Daviid; Yosia
- Lyricists: Bang Chan; Changbin; Han

Stray Kids singles chronology
"Mixtape: Time Out" (2022)	"Case 143" (2022)	"The Sound" (2023)

Music video
- "Case 143" on YouTube; Japanese version on YouTube

"Case 143" is a song recorded by South Korean boy band Stray Kids and the lead single from the group's seventh extended play Maxident, which was released on October 7, 2022, through JYP Entertainment and Republic Records. Written by 3Racha, Raphael of Producing Lab, and Daviid and Yosia of 3scape, "Case 143" is an electrohop and pop track, likening the confusion one feels when falling in love to an unsolved "case", referencing the number 143, a code for "I love you". The accompanying music video, directed by 725, premiered on the same day. The Japanese version was released on December 15.

== Background and release ==
On September 6, 2022, Stray Kids uploaded a trailer to announce that they would release the seventh EP Maxident. The track listing of the EP was revealed on September 13, appearing "Case 143" as the first track and the lead single. JYP Entertainment described that the track conveys a theme the group never do before as the lead single, later confirmed that it is about love. On September 17, the mashup video, providing sneak peeks of all the EP's tracks, including "Case 143", premiered at the "Seoul Special (Unveil 11) of Maniac World Tour.

The first music video teaser for "Case 143" was uploaded on October 3, previewing the music video's worldview, while the second on the 4th depicts parts of the song and performance. The performance video was also teased on October 5. Additionally snippet and choreography were revealed via TikTok on October 6, showing the members wearing SKZoo costumes. "Case 143" was released alongside the EP and its accompanying music video on October 7.

The Japanese version of "Case 143" first appeared on December 2 on the first line-up setlist of Music Station Ultra Super Live 2022, where Stray Kids would participate on December 23. It was subsequently released on December 15 as a standalone digital single, before including on the group's debut Japanese-language studio albums The Sound, released on February 22, 2023.

== Composition ==
"Case 143" is three minutes and twelve seconds long and was written by Stray Kids' in-house production team 3Racha, Raphael from Producing Lab, and Daviid and Yosia from 3scape. An electrohop and pop track, "Case 143" compares confused minds when falling in love with a "case" and expresses emotions through the number 143, a code for "I love you". The song was composed in the key of F♯ minor and 100 beats per minute.

== Critical reception ==
Writing for Teen Vogue, Crystal Bell praised "Case 143" as "full of surprises" and described it as "a love song for someone who gets easily distracted." Bell also wrote for Paper that "This isn't some grand, romanticized love song. It's vibrant, witty, and structurally, a little odd. In other words, it's a Stray Kids song." Rhian Daly of NME described the song that is "built around an ever-changing rush of sounds, some dark and ominous, others teetering and tumbling." Idology's Squib stated that the song as "the exhilaration multiplied as the tension was further relieved from the incisive spirit that had been present since the pre-debut, which was described as "a bit of a spirited spirit."

"Case 143" experienced popularity in Japan after going viral in the video-sharing application TikTok, resulting in the song being voted first place in Best Entertainment 2022's "Best K-Pop" by Japanese website Modelpress's readers. Several other publications included in their lists of the best K-pop songs of 2022, including Dazed (36th), Teen Vogue (unranked), and SCMP's Young Post (2nd).

== Music video ==
A scene from the "Case 143" music video, showing Seungmin rewinding while the video was paused.

An accompanying music video for "Case 143" was uploaded, along with the single on October 7, 2022. Directed by 725 of SL8, the music video starts with the heart-shaped monster, utilizing CGI elements, infecting Felix, then all members, so Changbin calls the police officers, who are also Stray Kids. The police officers go to examine the crime scene and try to arrest the monsters and monster-infected Stray Kids. The first has been arrested, but the latter still falls in love. The police officers pull the big plug, and the set collapses. Then, the video is paused, and Seungmin rewinds it back. The falling-in-love Stray Kids put the plug back to stop collapsing, and they break the video as glass to leave it. The music video surpassed 100 million views on YouTube on March 28, 2023, becoming their ninth music video to reach this milestone.

The performance video was uploaded on October 15, showing the choreography scene shot at the front of car wash and the street. The Japanese version's music video premiered on January 22, 2023. It was produced by Japanese illustrator Kawaisouni!, and serves as a frame-by-frame animated remake of the original music video. Characters made by Kawaisouni!, Opanchu Usagi and Npochamu, also appeared in the music video.

== Live performances ==
Between October 7 and 23, 2022, Stray Kids promoted Maxident with "Case 143" performance at several South Korean music programs, such as Music Bank, Show! Music Core, Inkigayo, Show Champion, and M Countdown. On October 8, the group performed the song at Music Universe K-909, along with the sub-unit tracks–"3Racha", "Taste", and "Can't Stop"; and the 2022 The Fact Music Awards, alongside "Maniac". "Case 143" was added to the setlist of Maniac World Tour since Jakarta shows on November 12.

During December 2022 – January 2023, the group performed "Case 143" at the 2022 Asia Artist Awards, along with "Charmer", the 2022 KBS Song Festival with "Maniac", the 2022 SBS Gayo Daejeon along with "Christmas EveL" and "24 to 25", the 2022 MBC Gayo Daejejeon alongside "Circus", and 37th Golden Disc Awards with "Super Board" and "Freeze". Stray Kids performed the Japanese version at 2022 FNS Music Festival on December 14, 2022, and six-hour special Music Station Ultra Super Live 2022 on the 23rd. In 2023, Stray Kids sang the Japanese version of the song on the YouTube channel The First Take on February 24, and performed at 74th NHK Kōhaku Uta Gassen on December 31.

== Accolades ==
Awards and nominations for "Case 143"
Ceremony	Year	Award	Result	Ref.
Asian Pop Music Awards	2022	Best Arranger (Overseas) (Note: Credited as Raphael (Producing Lab), Daviid (3scape), Yosia (3scape), and Bang Chan (3Racha))	Nominated	
Circle Chart Music Awards	2023	Artist of the Year – Digital Music Category (October)	Nominated	
MTV Video Music Awards Japan	2023	Best Group Video – International	Won	

Music program awards for "Case 143"
Program	Date	Ref.
Show Champion	October 12, 2022	
Show Champion	October 19, 2022	
M Countdown	October 13, 2022	
M Countdown	October 20, 2022	
Music Bank	October 14, 2022	
Music Bank	October 21, 2022	

== Credits and personnel ==
Locations

- JYP Publishing (KOMCA) – publishing
- Copyright Control – publishing
- Sony Music Publishing (Japan) Inc. – publishing (Japanese version)
- JYPE Studios – recording, mixing
- Channie's "Room" – recording
- The Mastering Palace – mastering

Personnel

- Stray Kids – vocals
  - Bang Chan (3Racha) – lyrics, composition, arrangement, digital editing, recording
  - Changbin (3Racha) – lyrics, composition
  - Han (3Racha) – lyrics, composition
- KM-Markit – Japanese lyrics (Japanese version)
- Raphael (Producing Lab) – composition, arrangement, drum, bass, synthesizer, electric guitar, computer programming
- Daviid (3scape) – composition, arrangement, drum, bass, synthesizer, computer programming
- Yosia (3scape) – composition, arrangement, piano, electric piano
- Lee Kyeong-won – digital editing
- Eom Se-hee – recording
- Lee Sang-yeop – recording
- Lee Tae-sub – mixing
- Dave Kutch – mastering

== Charts ==
=== Weekly charts ===
Weekly chart performance for "Case 143"
Chart (2022)	Peak position
Global 200 (Billboard)	59
Hungary (Single Top 40)	4
Japan Hot 100 (Billboard)	14
Japan Combined Singles (Oricon)	20
Lithuania (AGATA)	99
Netherlands (Dutch Global Top 40)	39
New Zealand Hot Singles (RMNZ)	10
Singapore (RIAS)	24
South Korea (Circle)	20
UK Independent (Official Charts)	45
UK Singles Sales (OCC)	74
US World Digital Song Sales (Billboard)	1

Weekly chart performance for "Case 143" (Japanese version)
Chart (2022)	Peak position
Japan Combined Singles (Oricon)	48

=== Monthly charts ===
Monthly chart performance for "Case 143"
Chart (2022)	Position
South Korea (Circle)	72

=== Year-end charts ===
2022 year-end chart performance for "Case 143"
Chart (2022)	Position
South Korea Download (Circle)	95

2023 year-end chart performance for "Case 143"
Chart (2023)	Position
Japan (Japan Hot 100)	83

== Certifications ==
Certifications for "Case 143"
Region	Certification	Certified units/sales
United States (RIAA)	Gold	500,000^{‡}
Streaming
Japan (RIAJ)	Platinum	100,000,000^{†}
^{‡} Sales+streaming figures based on certification alone.^{†} Streaming-only figures based on certification alone.

== Release history ==
Release dates and formats for "Case 143"
Region	Date	Format	Version	Label	Ref.
Various	October 7, 2022	Digital download; streaming	Korean	JYP; Republic	
Various	December 15, 2022	Digital download; streaming	Japanese	Epic Japan	

== See also ==
- List of M Countdown Chart winners (2022)
- List of Music Bank Chart winners (2022)
- List of Show Champion Chart winners (2022)
