= Your Eyes (Stray Kids song) =

Single by Stray Kids

from the EP Circus
- Language: Japanese
- Released: June 1, 2022
- Length: 3:16
- Label: Epic Japan
- Composers: Bang Chan; Changbin; Jun2
- Lyricists: Bang Chan; Changbin; KM-Markit

Stray Kids singles chronology
"Maniac" (2022)	"Your Eyes" (2022)	"Circus" (2022)

Music video
- "Your Eyes" on YouTube

"Your Eyes" is a song recorded by South Korean boy band Stray Kids. It appears as the sixth and final track on their second Japanese-language extended play (EP), Circus. The song was released on June 1, 2022, through Epic Records Japan, as the second single of the EP after the Japanese version of "Maniac".

== Release and composition ==
Stray Kids' second Japanese-language extended play (EP), was announced on April 4, 2022. Later the title Circus and track listing were revealed on May 16, including the sixth and final track "Your Eyes". The song was released to digital music and streaming platforms on June 1, in conjunction with its accompanying music video.

"Your Eyes" is described as a love ballad song driven by piano, written by Bang Chan and Changbin from 3Racha, an in-house production team of Stray Kids, and KM-Markit, and co-composed with Jun2. The song expresses the lover's gaze with the feeling of anxiousness sometimes but still wishing to be happy in the relationship. It was composed in the key of D major, 130 beats per minute with a running time of three minutes and seventeen seconds.

== Commercial performance ==
"Your Eyes" entered the Billboard Japan Hot 100 in the chart issue dated June 8, 2022, at number 68.

== Music video ==
An accompanying music video for "Your Eyes" was premiered on June 1, 2022, alongside the single release. It was preceded by eight member-individual teasers. Directed by Novvkim, the music video is described as a "virtual date", drawing the lover's perspective spend time doing several things with each member all day long, from the morning to the night.

== Credits and personnel ==
Personnel

- Stray Kids – vocals, background vocals
  - Bang Chan (3Racha) – lyrics, composition, all instruments, computer programming, vocal directing, digital editing
  - Changbin (3Racha) – lyrics, composition, vocal directing
  - Han (3Racha) – lyrics, composition, vocal directing
- KM-Markit – Japanese lyrics
- Jun2 – composition, arrangement, all instruments, vocal directing
- Lee Sang-yeop – recording
- Lim Hong-jin – mixing
- Kwon Nam-woo – mastering

Locations

- Sony Music Publishing (Japan) Inc. – publishing
- JYP Publishing (KOMCA) – publishing
- JYPE Studios – recording, mixing
- 821 Sound Mastering – mastering

== Charts ==
Chart performance for "Your Eyes"
Chart (2022)	Peak position
Japan (Japan Hot 100)	68

== Release history ==
Release dates and formats for "Your Eyes"
Region	Date	Format	Label	Ref.
Various	June 1, 2022	Digital download; streaming	Epic Japan	
