= Circus (EP) =

- Regular and digital cover

EP by Stray Kids
- Released: June 22, 2022
- Studios: JYPE (Seoul); Channie's "Room" (Seoul); Jisang's (Seoul)
- Genres: Hip-hop; trap; rock; pop
- Length: 19:11
- Languages: Japanese; English
- Label: Epic Japan
- Producers: 3Racha; Chan's; Darm; DallasK; Earattack; Hong Ji-sang; Jun2; Millionboy; Versachoi

Stray Kids chronology
Oddinary (2022)	Circus (2022)	Maxident (2022)

Singles from Circus
- 1. "Maniac (Japanese ver.)" Released: May 18, 2022; 2. "Your Eyes" Released: June 1, 2022; 3. "Circus" Released: June 10, 2022

Circus is the second Japanese-language extended play (EP) (tenth overall) by South Korean boy band Stray Kids. It was released on June 22, 2022, through Epic Records Japan. Centered on a circus concept with hip-hop, trap, rock, and pop elements, the EP consists of six tracks, preceded by the Japanese version of "Maniac", "Your Eyes", and the title track. Commercially, Circus debuted at number two on the Oricon Albums Chart, and atop Billboard Japan Hot Albums, and was certified platinum by Recording Industry Association of Japan (RIAJ), surpassing 250,000 copies.

== Background and release ==
On April 4, 2022, two weeks after the group's sixth Korean extended play (EP) Oddinary release, Stray Kids announced their second Japanese EP, scheduled for release on June 22, after their first Japan leg of their Maniac World Tour ends. Pre-orders for the EP began on the same date, coming in four editions on CD–limited A, limited B, regular, and FC. The limited A edition additionally includes DVD, while the limited B SpecialZine. In a Pia Music Complex magazine interview on April 21, Bang Chan stated that the EP will give the group's "refreshing power" and "blow away all the heat of summer", while Changbin said that they will show both "unique" and "different" side of the EP.

From May 12 to 16, Stray Kids posted individual and group teaser images, depicting a concept of circus. On May 16, the EP's title was revealed, named Circus, alongside the cover artworks for each edition, and the track listing, containing three new tracks, and the Japanese versions of "Venom" and "Maniac" from Oddinary (2022), and "Silent Cry" from Noeasy (2021). Additionally, the limited A edition includes the music video of the previous-release single "Scars", and its behind-the-scene. The EP was preceded by three single: "Maniac (Japanese ver.)", released on May 18, "Your Eyes" on June 1, and the title track on June 10. The latter two were released alongside their accompanying music videos.

== Music and lyrics ==
Circus is nineteen minutes and eleven seconds long, consisting of six tracks. It opens with the title track, "Circus", a hip-hop-dance track centered on the circus theme, featuring "vaulting" pluck bass, "addictive" vocal chops, and "solid" drums, which make sounds like elephant footsteps in the circus". It is followed by the second track "Fairytale", based on the theme "the ideal love of the world is all like a fairy tale". The final track, "Your Eyes", is a ballad love song driven by piano about the lover's gaze with the feeling of anxiousness sometimes but still wishing to be happy in the relationship.

== Promotion ==
To promote Circus, Stray Kids appeared on the covers and gave interviews for the July–October 2022 issue of Japanese magazines CanCam. Mini, Nikkei Entertainment!, Pia Music Complex, Vivi, Smart, and Rolling Stone Japan (only interview). The group appeared for televised interview at Venue101 on May 12, as well as the five-hour-special Kami Oto: Kamigata Otomatsuri on May 28, The Time on June 21, Mezamashi TV on June 23, and Asadesu on June 29. FamilyMart, HEP Five, and FuRyu partnered with Stray Kids for several campaigns to commemorate the release of Circus in June.

Stray Kids gave the debut performance of "Circus" at the first Kobe show of the Maniac World Tour in Japan on June 11. On the same day, they performed "Maniac (Japanese ver.)" at Venue 101, broadcast from World Memorial Hall, where they held the concert. The group appeared on the morning show Sukkiri on June 14, to perform "Circus". Following the EP release, Stray Kids held the pre-recorded livestream event to introduced the EP via YouTube, TikTok, and Abema. The group performed "Circus", along with "Back Door", at Buzz Rhythm 02 on July 9, and the two-hour special Music Station on August 5.

== Commercial performance ==
According to Oricon, Circus has sold 97,804 copies on June 21, 2022, the flying get date. The EP entered Oricon Albums Chart at number two with 131,921 CD copies in its first week, behind only Tatsuro Yamashita's 2022 album Softly. It also debuted at number one on the Billboard Japan Hot Albums, selling 198,239 physical copies (number one on the Top Album Sales), and 986 downloads (number eight on the Download Chart) on the first week. The album also charted on the ARIA Physical Albums at number 12, and the Croatian HDU International Albums at number 28.

== Track listing ==
Circus track listing
No.	Title	Lyrics	Music	Arrangement	Length
1.	"Circus"	Bang Chan (3Racha); Changbin (3Racha); Han (3Racha); KM-Markit	Bang Chan; Changbin; Han; Earattack; Chan's; Darm	Bang Chan; Earattack; Chan's; Darm	3:14
2.	"Fairytale"	Han; KM-Markit	Han; Millionboy	Millionboy; Bang Chan	2:52
3.	"Venom" (蜘蛛の糸; Japanese version)	Bang Chan; Changbin; Han; Yohei	Bang Chan; Changbin; Han; DallasK	DallasK; Bang Chan	3:15
4.	"Maniac" (Japanese version)	Bang Chan; Changbin; Han; KM-Markit	Bang Chan; Changbin; Han; Versachoi	Versachoi; Bang Chan	3:03
5.	"Silent Cry" (Japanese version)	Bang Chan; Changbin; Han; KM-Markit	Bang Chan; Changbin; Han; Hong Ji-sang	Hong Ji-sang	3:31
6.	"Your Eyes"	Bang Chan; Changbin; KM-Markit	Bang Chan; Changbin; Jun2	Jun2	3:16
Total length:					19:11

Limited A – DVD
No.	Title	Director(s)	Length
1.	"Jacket shooting making movie"		8:19
2.	"Jacket shooting making movie" (relay cam version)		8:26
3.	"Scars" (music video)	Bang Jae-yeob	3:49
4.	"Scars" (music video making movie)		6:26
Total length:			27:00

Notes

- The Japanese title of track 3 "蜘蛛の糸" (Kumo no Ito) means a spider's thread.

== Credits and personnel ==
Musicians

- Stray Kids – vocals, background vocals
  - Bang Chan (3Racha) – lyrics (except 2), composition (except 2), arrangement (except 5, 6), all instruments (1, 3, 6), computer programming (1, 3, 6), vocal directing (except 2, 5)
  - Changbin (3Racha) – lyrics (except 2), composition (except 2), vocal directing (except 2, 5)
  - Han (3Racha) – lyrics (except 6), composition (except 6), vocal directing (except 5)
- KM-Markit – Japanese lyrics (except 3)
- Yohei – Japanese lyrics (3)
- Earattack – background vocals (1), composition (1), arrangement (1), all instruments (1), computer programming (1), vocal directing (1)
- Chan's – composition (1), arrangement (1), all instruments (1), computer programming (1)
- Darm – composition (1), arrangement (1), all instruments (1), computer programming (1)
- Millionboy – composition (2), arrangement (2), all instruments (2), computer programming (2), vocal directing (2)
- DallasK – composition (3), arrangement (3), all instruments (3), computer programming (3)
- Versachoi – composition (4), arrangement (4), all instruments (4), computer programming (4)
- Hong Ji-sang – composition (5), arrangement (5), all instruments (5), electric guitar (5), bass (5), keyboards (5), computer programming (5), vocal directing (5)
- Jun2 – composition (6), arrangement (6), all instruments (6), vocal directing (6)

Technical

- Goo Hye-jin – recording (except 2, 6)
- Park Eun-jung – recording (2, 5)
- Bang Chan (3Racha) – recording (4), digital editing (3, 6)
- Lim Hong-jin – recording (5), mixing (3, 6)
- Eom Se-hee – recording (5)
- Hong Ji-sang – recording (5), digital editing (5)
- Lee Sang-yeop – recording (6)
- Lee Kyeong-won – digital editing (1, 3, 4)
- Park Nam-jun – digital editing (2), mixing assistant (2, 5)
- Lee Tae-sub – mixing (1)
- Shin Bong-won – mixing (2, 5)
- Manny Marroquin – mixing (4)
- Kwon Nam-woo – mastering (except 4)
- Dave Kutch – mastering (4)

Locations

- Sony Music Publishing (Japan) Inc. – publishing
- JYP Publishing (KOMCA) – publishing
- Music Cube Inc. – publishing (1)
- Cube Entertainment Inc. – publishing (1)
- Fujipacific Music Korea Inc. – publishing (1)
- Prescription Songs (ASCAP) – publishing (3)
- JYPE Studios – recording, mixing (1, 3, 6)
- Channie's "Room" – recording (4)
- Jisang's Studio – recording (5)
- KayOne Sounds – digital editing (1, 3, 4)
- Glab Studio – digital editing (2), mixing (2, 5)
- Larrabee Studios – mixing (4)
- 821 Sound Mastering – mastering (except 4)
- The Mastering Palace – mastering (4)

== Charts ==
=== Weekly charts ===
Weekly chart performance for Circus
Chart (2022)	Peak position
Australian Physical Albums (ARIA)	12
Croatian International Albums (HDU)	28
Japanese Albums (Oricon)	2
Japanese Combined Albums (Oricon)	2
Japanese Hot Albums (Billboard Japan)	1

=== Monthly charts ===
Monthly chart performance for Circus
Chart (2022)	Peak position
Japanese Albums (Oricon)	5

=== Year-end charts ===
Year-end chart performance for Circus
Chart (2022)	Position
Japanese Albums (Oricon)	27
Japanese Hot Albums (Billboard Japan)	25

== Certifications and sales ==
Certifications and sales figures for Circus
Region	Certification	Certified units/sales
Japan (RIAJ) Physical	Platinum	250,000^{^}
Japan Digital	—	993
^{^} Shipments figures based on certification alone.

== Release history ==
Release dates and formats for Circus
Region	Date	Format	Version	Label	Ref.
Japan	June 22, 2022	CD+DVD	Limited A	Epic Japan	
Japan	June 22, 2022	CD+SpecialZine	Limited B	Epic Japan	
Japan	June 22, 2022	CD	Regular; FC	Epic Japan	
Various	June 22, 2022	Digital download; streaming	Digital	Epic Japan	
South Korea	June 22, 2022	Digital download; streaming	Digital	JYP	

== See also ==
- List of Billboard Japan Hot Albums number ones of 2022
