= Circus (Stray Kids song) =

Single by Stray Kids

from the EP Circus
- Language: Japanese
- Released: June 10, 2022
- Genre: Hip hop; dance
- Length: 3:14
- Label: Epic Japan
- Composers: Bang Chan; Changbin; Han; Earattack; Chan's; Darm
- Lyricists: Bang Chan; Changbin; Han; KM-Markit

Stray Kids singles chronology
"Your Eyes" (2022)	"Circus" (2022)	"Mixtape: Time Out" (2022)

Music video
- "Circus" on YouTube

"Circus" is a song recorded by South Korean boy band Stray Kids. It appears as the first track on their second Japanese-language extended play (EP) of the same name. The song was released on June 10, 2022, through Epic Records Japan, as the third and lead single of the EP after the Japanese version of "Maniac", and "Your Eyes". The Korean version was included on their seventh Korean-language EP Maxident.

== Release and composition ==
Stray Kids' second Japanese-language extended play (EP), was announced on April 4, 2022. Later the title Circus and track listing were revealed on May 16, including the first track of the same name, "Circus". The song was released to digital music and streaming platforms on June 10, in conjunction with its accompanying music video premiere. The Korean version of the song was included on the group's seventh Korean-language EP Maxident, scheduled for release on October 7.

"Circus" is a hip hop-dance song written by Stray Kids' in-house production team, 3Racha, with Earattack, Chan's and Darm, composed in the key of F minor, 98 beats per minute with a running time of three minutes and fourteen seconds. The song centered on the circus theme, featuring word playing, "vaulting" pluck bass, "addictive" vocal chops, and "solid" drums, which make sounds like "elephant footsteps in the circus".

== Commercial performance ==
"Circus" entered the Billboard Japan Hot 100 in the chart issue dated June 15, 2022, at number 96 and ascended to number 47 on the next week. The song landed at number 43 on the Oricon Combined Singles Chart. Internationally, "Circus" entered the RMNZ Hot Singles Chart at number 29. The Korean version debuted at number 34 on the Circle Download Chart.

== Music video ==
An accompanying music video for "Circus", directed by Bang Jae-yeob, was premiered alongside the single release on June 10, 2022, preceded by two teasers. It depicts Stray Kids members performing in a circus tent with real circus performers. The members are divided into two circuses, and 16 members, using compositing technology. The music video surpassed 100 million views on YouTube, becoming their first Japanese original song's music video to do so.

== Live performances ==
Stray Kids gave the debut performance of "Circus" on June 11, 2022, at their first show of Maniac World Tour in Japan at World Memorial Hall, Kobe. The group also appeared on the morning show Sukkiri on June 14 to give an interview and perform the song. The group performed "Circus" at Buzz Rhythm 02 on July 9, alongside "Back Door", the two-hour special episode of Music Station on August 5, and Best Artist 2022 on December 3, along with "Maniac". The Korean version was performed for the first time their "Seoul Special (Unveil 11)" of Maniac World Tour on September 17, as well as the 2022 MBC Gayo Daejejeon alongside "Case 143" on January 1, 2023.

== Credits and personnel ==
Personnel

- Stray Kids – vocals, background vocals
  - Bang Chan (3Racha) – lyrics, composition, all instruments, computer programming, vocal directing, digital editing
  - Changbin (3Racha) – lyrics, composition, vocal directing
  - Han (3Racha) – lyrics, composition, vocal directing
- KM-Markit – Japanese lyrics
- Earattack – background vocals, composition, arrangement, all instruments, computer programming, vocal directing
- Chan's – composition, arrangement, all instruments, computer programming
- Darm – composition, arrangement, all instruments, computer programming
- Goo Hye-jin – recording
- Lee Kyeong-won – digital editing
- Lee Tae-sub – mixing
- Kwon Nam-woo – mastering

Locations

- Sony Music Publishing (Japan) Inc. – publishing
- JYP Publishing (KOMCA) – publishing
- Music Cube Inc. – publishing
- Cube Entertainment Inc. – publishing
- Fujipacific Music Korea Inc. – publishing
- JYPE Studios – recording, mixing
- KayOne Sounds – digital editing
- 821 Sound Mastering – mastering

== Charts ==
Chart performance for "Circus"
Chart (2022)	Peak position
Japan (Japan Hot 100)	47
Japan Combined Singles (Oricon)	43
New Zealand Hot Singles (RMNZ)	29
South Korea Download (Circle) Korean version	34

== Release history ==
Release dates and formats for "Circus"
Region	Date	Format	Label	Ref.
Various	June 10, 2022	Digital download; streaming	Epic Japan	
