= Oddinary =

- Digital cover

EP by Stray Kids
- Released: March 18, 2022
- Studios: JYPE (Seoul); Channie's "Room" (Seoul)
- Genres: Hip-hop; trap; EDM; rock
- Length: 22:03
- Languages: Korean; English
- Labels: JYP; Republic
- Producers: 3Racha; Versachoi; DallasK; Trippy; Jun2; Nickko Young; Millionboy

Stray Kids chronology
SKZ2021 (2021)	Oddinary (2022)	Circus (2022)

Singles from Oddinary
- 1. "Maniac" Released: March 18, 2022

Oddinary is the sixth extended play and ninth overall recorded by South Korean boy band Stray Kids. It was released on March 18, 2022, through JYP Entertainment and Republic Records, seven months after the band's second studio album Noeasy (2021). The EP is Stray Kids' first release on Republic Records, which they signed in February 2022. A blend of "odd" and "ordinary", Oddinary represents "all of us who have something odd about ourselves" and the concept "odd things will soon become ordinary".

Material on the EP was primarily written and produced by 3Racha, an in-house production team of Stray Kids and other members; other producers on Oddinary include Versachoi, DallasK, Trippy, Jun2, Nickko Young, and Millionboy, with whom most of the group has previously worked. It consists of seven tracks, of which "Maniac" serves as lead single, and includes various musical genres such as hip-hop, trap, EDM, and rock. Upon its release, the EP received positive reviews from music critics. To promote Oddinary, Stray Kids embarked on their second concert tour, Maniac World Tour, which commenced in late April 2022.

Oddinary peaked at number one on the album charts in South Korea, Finland, Poland, and the United States; and entered the top 10 in Belgium, Croatia, Denmark, Hungary, Japan, Lithuania, Sweden, and Switzerland. It marked Stray Kids' first appearance on the US Billboard 200 and the UK Official Albums Chart, among others. The EP has sold over 1.7 million copies, becoming the group's second million-selling album after Noeasy, and was certified million by the Korea Music Content Association (KMCA). According to the International Federation of the Phonographic Industry (IFPI), Oddinary was the fourteenth best-selling album worldwide in 2022.

== Background ==
Stray Kids uploaded the video "Step Out 2022" via their social media on January 1, 2022; the video outlined the group's accomplishments in 2021 and plans for the new year, which included releasing two albums. On February 10, it was announced the group had signed an exclusive contract with Republic Records for promotions in the United States. The group held their second fan meeting at Olympic Hall on February 12 and 13, the second day of which was webcast as a paid livestream via Beyond Live. At the end of the event, Stray Kids premiered a comeback trailer for their upcoming EP Oddinary, which was scheduled for release on March 18. The trailer was later uploaded on their social media accounts. According to band member Bang Chan: "With the title Oddinary, we want to bring the message that everyone has their own odd in them, and that's totally ordinary".

The EP's title, Oddinary, is a portmanteau of two words: "odd" and "ordinary". It represents "all of us who are ordinary also have odd sides" and the idea that "odd things will soon become ordinary". In a StarNews interview on March 4, Stray Kids said the EP would show their "potential energy", be "crazy" in the meaning of "extraordinary", and show a "new side". Their label JYP Entertainment stated the group "will solidify its presence and continue its surge in popularity through the extraordinary music, concept, and performance of the new well-made release".

== Music and lyrics ==
Oddinary is twenty-two minutes and three seconds long, and consists of seven tracks in various musical genres including hip-hop, trap, EDM, and rock. All of the tracks were mainly produced and written by Bang Chan, Changbin, and Han, who worked as the in-house production team under the moniker 3Racha. Other members also participated in writing the tracks; Lee Know, Seungmin, and I.N co-wrote "Waiting for Us" while Hyunjin and Felix co-wrote "Muddy Water". Other songwriter-producers Versachoi, DallasK, Trippy, Jun2, Nickko Young, and Millionboy, most of whom the group has worked with previous records, also co-wrote songs for the release.

In an online press conference to promote Oddinary, Changbin stated the EP has added relaxation, composure, and moderation more than the previous release, which focused on explosive energy, while according to Bang Chan: "We wanted to tell that the part of you which can seem odd and strange to people around you can serve as a special factor that can make you cooler and more gorgeous". In the introduction video Intro "Oddinary", leader Bang Chan said every song on the EP blends into the main theme of Oddinary.

=== Songs ===
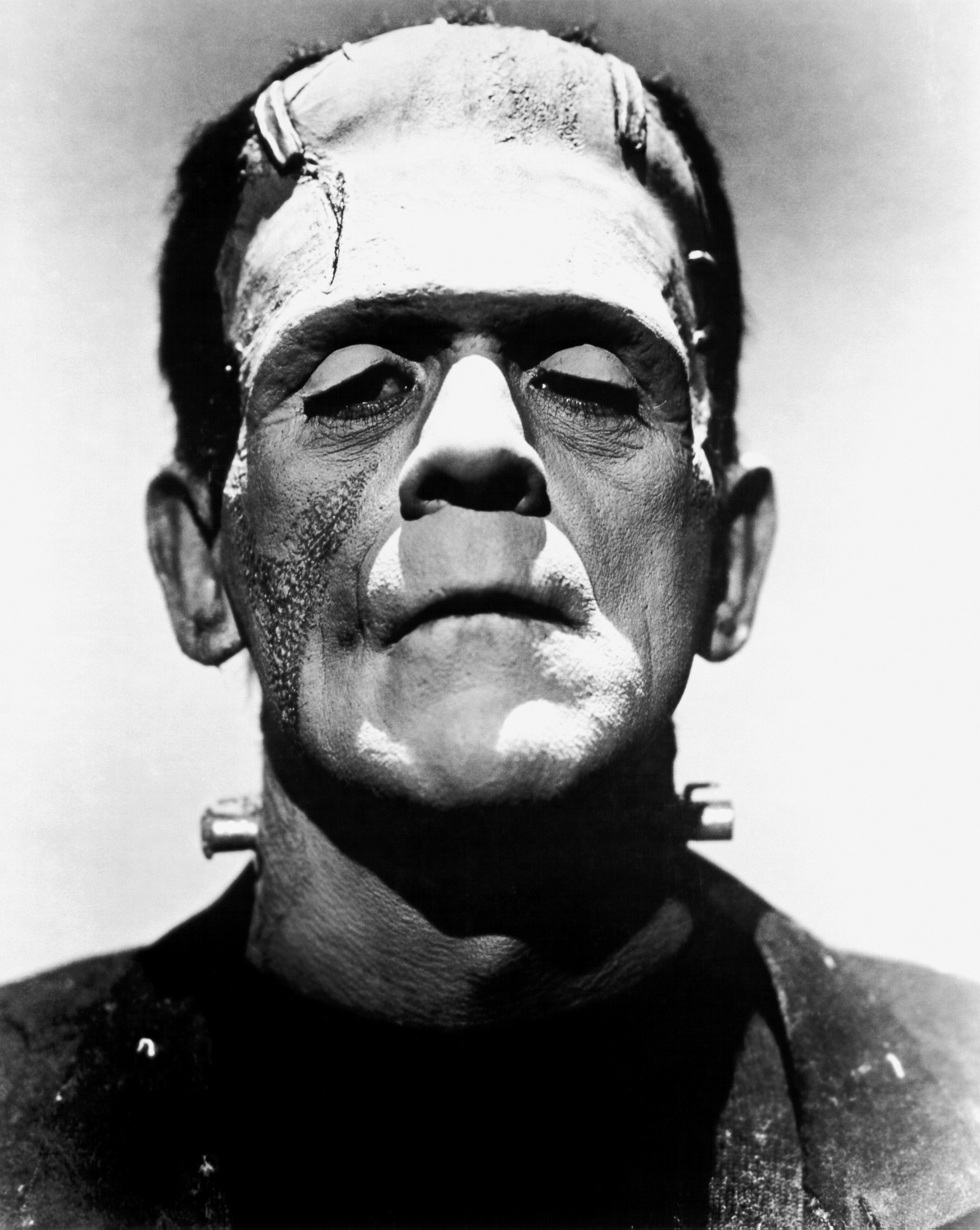
Lyrically, "Maniac" compares "odd" people to Frankenstein (pictured).

Oddinary opens with the trap hip-hop track "Venom", which suggests the impossibility of escaping someone's fatal charm, metaphorized as a spider, its web, and venom. It is followed by "Maniac", a trap electropop song whose bass-synth drop, bird-chirping, and power drill sound tell the story of "odd " people who break the society's social norms and expectations, comparing them with Frankenstein's monster. The third track "Charmer" is a hip-hop song that includes a snake-charmer-like flute sound that is inspired by the story of the Pied Piper of Hamelin; it is about self-confidence, which can charm others. According to critics, "Maniac" and "Charmer" are influenced by Middle Eastern music. "Freeze", the fourth track, is a riddim, dubstep, and EDM song that is influenced by hip-hop beats and expresses the intention to overcome a problem, the excitement of breaking free, and the pursuit of dreams. The song was compared with the game freeze tag.

The fifth track "Lonely St." is a rock song that describes loneliness and feeling lost, and the inner narrative of youths; it includes imagery of a person walking along an abandoned street. It is characterized by "rough" and "delicate" vocals; makes much use of Auto-Tune; and includes hand-claps, light grunge guitar, and trap beats. "Waiting for Us", the sixth track, is sung by Bang Chan, Lee Know, Seungmin, and I.N., and is described as a "heartfelt", soulful, soft rock, and indie rock ballad that talks about missing someone who promises to wait indefinitely for them. Oddinary concludes with Changbin's, Hyunjin's, Han's, and Felix's "Muddy Water", a jazzy '90s hip-hop, boom bap, and old-school that discusses actions that reject contemporary societal values.

== Release and promotion ==
A scene in the trailer, where Felix enters the "ORDINARY" building, before changing to "ODDINARY".

On February 13, 2022, Stray Kids premiered a video trailer for their upcoming EP Oddinary at the end of a fan meeting at SKZ's Chocolate Factory. On February 28, the trailer was uploaded to the band's social media accounts. Directed by Kwon Yong-soo, The video depicts band member Felix holding a padlock, boarding a bus, and entering a building with the neon sign "ORDINARY", which suddenly changes to read "ODDINARY". He meets the other members, who attempt to corner him. The trailer shows Hyunjin whispering in Felix's left ear, followed by the caption "Do you want to be ODDINARY?" and a series of ellipses. Hyunjin pushes Felix from the window before jumping after him, and breaking and unlocking the padlock. At the end, Felix, wearing a different outfit, walks to stand with the other members, showing his left eye turning green.

Pre-orders for Oddinary began on the same day as the trailer release, coming in three editions on CD—a limited Frankenstein version and two standard versions, Scanning and Mask Off, including the Target exclusive versions alongside a pre-save on Apple Music and Spotify. The complete track listing of the EP was posted on March 3, confirming "Maniac" as the lead single. Concept teaser images were uploaded on social media in three sets from March 4–5, 7–8, and 11–12. The first set depicts the band members in black clothes standing in front of a radiograph or shadow of a head with screws. The second shows the members wearing black-and-white costumes with a black mannequin and metal detectors. In the third, the members wear colorful outfits with exploding firecrackers and cracked, smiling, emoticon props in the background.

Stray Kids teased the tracks via excerpt videos titled "Unveil: Track" for "Venom" on March 6, "Lonely St." on March 10, and "Freeze" on March 13, and as well as a mashup video that revealed the other tracks on March 14. Three music-video teasers for "Maniac" were released on March 15–17. Before the release, they uploaded the 20-minute documentary video Intro "Oddinary" and held an online press conference. Oddinary was released on March 18, in conjunction with an accompanying music video for "Maniac", at retail stores, and on digital music and streaming platforms. It was the band's first release on Republic Records after signing with label in February 2022. In addition to the lead single, the music videos for "Venom", "Lonely St.", and "Freeze" were released on March 23, 27, and 28, respectively, Individual-member-cover jewel case versions of Oddinary were released on March 28.

Stray Kids began promoting Oddinary with the debut performance of "Maniac" at KBS2's Music Bank, and CBS's The Late Show with Stephen Colbert on March 18, the same date as the release. However, on that day, JYP Entertainment announced that subsequent promotions had been postponed due to most members, except Felix and I.N, testing positive for COVID-19. On March 26, the label announced that Stray Kids would continue promoting at the music shows beginning at Show Champion on March 30, including M Countdown, Music Bank, Inkigayo, and Show! Music Core. The group also performed "Maniac" at Virtual Gayo Top 10 on March 25, and MTV Fresh Out Live on April 1.

In support of Oddinary, Stray Kids announced their second concert tour, titled "Maniac", on March 7, 2022, while teasing the EP. The 42-show tour opened with shows from April 29 to May 1 at Jamsil Indoor Stadium, Seoul, South Korea, and traveled to Japan, the United States, and the Asia Pacific region. It was the group's first concert tour in two years since their first tour, District 9: Unlock. In this tour, besides "Maniac", Stray Kids performed all of Oddinary for the first time, except "Freeze", which was first performed at 37th Golden Disc Awards on January 7, 2023, and later included on the setlist on March 22, 2023, at Atlanta show of the tour.

== Critical reception ==
Professional ratings
Review scores
Source	Rating
AllMusic	4/5 stars
NME	4/5 stars

Upon its release, Oddinary received positive reviews from music critics. Rolling Stone India's Divyansha Dongre described it as a "powerful" EP and wrote of the group's "commitment towards re-defining their style and artistic growth". Tamar Herman from South China Morning Post said the EP "has gathered a lot of buzz". Nandini Iyengar of Bollywood Hungama praised Stray Kids for "proving their musical capabilities" and using everyday words more meaningfully on the EP. Writing for NME, Tássia Assis gave the EP four stars out of five, noting the EP reflectes Stray Kids' "extraordinary passion, wit, and growth", and praised it as an "elegant step forward for a group who, hopefully, will never get tired of raising questions".

Crystal Bell from Teen Vogue said of Oddinary: "The nature of that essence can best be described by the meaning of ODDINARY itself ... so why not embrace the things that made you different? It's the same principle that's been guiding Stray Kids from the very beginning, and it's why so many have fallen under their spell. They're not about to compromise now." AllMusic reviewer Neil Z. Young gave the EP four stars out of five, stating the EP encapsulates the band's many sides; showcases their "aggressive blend of dance-friendly electronic and hip-hop"; and offers "hard-hitting anthems, earnest R&B-inspired vocal harmonies, and proof of rap prowess on the mike". According to Idology's writer Yemi, the EP "shows the skill that naturally appears according to the [band's] career"; Yani also said it "has not deviated too much from the previous releases in terms of sound and theme consciousness" because it "present[s] something 'neatly organized', which is a virtue that is far from the team's previous appearance".

=== Accolades ===
Billboard listed Oddinary as one of the 50 best albums of 2022 at that time. According to the magazine's J. Lipshutz, the EP "mixes pop hooks, rap cadences and dance tempos in a manner familiar to mainstream K-pop, but each song lands with a dazzling intensity". Oddinary was also included in unranked lists of the best K-pop albums of 2022 by Nylon, Uproxx,. Some of the EP's b-sides also appeared on year-end best lists of several publications; "Charmer" was named one of the best K-pop songs of 2022 by Mashable (1), MTV (9), BuzzFeed, and Teen Vogue, and while "Muddy Water" appeared at number 11 on Paper's list of the best K-pop b-sides of the year.

List of awards and nominations received by Oddinary
Ceremony	Year	Category	Result	Ref.
Asia Artist Awards	2022	Album of the Year (Daesang) (Note: Credited as Stray Kids)	Won	
Circle Chart Music Awards	2023	Artist of the Year – Album Category (2nd Quarter)	Nominated	

== Commercial performance ==
On March 17, 2022, the day before its release, it was reported Oddinary had sold 1.3 million copies in pre-orders, surpassing the 930,000 pre-orders of Noeasy and setting a new record as JYP Entertainment's most pre-ordered album. According to Hanteo Chart, the EP sold 855,021 copies in its first week. In South Korea, Oddinary debuted at number one on the Gaon Album Chart on the issue date of March 13–19, selling 1,546,907 as of March. making it Stray Kids' best-selling album and second million-selling album after Noeasy. Additionally, all seven of the album's tracks simultaneously entered the top 30 of the Gaon Download Chart. Oddinary received a "million" certification from the Korea Music Content Association (KMCA) on May 12, 2022.

In the United States, Oddinary debuted at number one on the Billboard 200 on the issue dated April 4, 2022, becoming Stray Kids' first album to appear on the chart, and the third Korean act to top the chart after BTS and SuperM. Of the 110,000 album-equivalent units sold in its first week, 103,000 were pure sales with all but 2,500 of those being physical copies, and 10.09 million were on-demand streams; at the time it was the biggest sales week for an album in the US in 2022. The EP also peaked at number one the Top Album Sales, Top Current Album Sales, and World Albums charts, and remained there on the latter chart for six consecutive weeks. The debut of Oddinary resulted in Stray Kids re-entering Billboard's Artist 100 at number one for the first time, becoming the fourth Korean act to top it since BTS, Blackpink, and SuperM. Four of the EP's tracks entered the World Digital Song Sales, including "Maniac", which peaked at number one on that chart.

Oddinary also appeared for the first time on several other national album charts; the Canadian Albums Chart at number 20, the Czech ČNS IFPI Albums Top 100 at number 87, the Italian FIMI Albums Chart at number 48, the New Zealand Official Top 40 Albums at number 33, the Swedish Sverigetopplistan Weekly Album at number 5, and the UK Official Albums Chart at number 95. It topped the Official Finnish Albums Chart, and the Polish OLiS Chart for the first time. Oddinary also charted in Australia (92), Austria (11), Belgium in both Flanders (5) and Wallonia (5), Croatia (2), Denmark (3), Germany (43), Hungary (2), Japan on both Oricon (4), and Billboard Japan (20), Lithuania (3), the Netherlands (12), Spain (48), and Switzerland (10). On February 24, 2023, the International Federation of the Phonographic Industry (IFPI) reported that Oddinary was the fourteenth best-selling album in 2022, alongside the October EP Maxident, which was sixth.

== Track listing ==
Oddinary track listing
No.	Title	Lyrics	Music	Arrangement	Length
1.	"Venom" (거미줄)	Bang Chan (3Racha); Changbin (3Racha); Han (3Racha)	Bang Chan; Changbin; Han; DallasK	DallasK; Bang Chan	3:15
2.	"Maniac"	Bang Chan; Changbin; Han	Bang Chan; Changbin; Han; Versachoi	Versachoi; Bang Chan	3:02
3.	"Charmer"	Bang Chan; Changbin; Han	Bang Chan; Changbin; Han; Versachoi	Versachoi	3:08
4.	"Freeze" (땡)	Bang Chan; Changbin; Han	Bang Chan; Changbin; Han; Trippy	Trippy; Bang Chan	2:58
5.	"Lonely St."	Bang Chan; Changbin	Bang Chan; Changbin; Jun2	Jun2; Bang Chan	2:44
6.	"Waiting for Us" (피어난다; Bang Chan, Lee Know, Seungmin, I.N)	Bang Chan; Lee Know; Seungmin; I.N	Bang Chan; Lee Know; Seungmin; I.N; Nickko Young	Nickko Young; Bang Chan	3:39
7.	"Muddy Water" (Changbin, Hyunjin, Han, Felix)	Changbin; Hyunjin; Han; Felix	Changbin; Hyunjin; Han; Felix; Millionboy	Millionboy; Bang Chan	3:17
Total length:					22:03

Notes

Translation of track titles in Korean:

- Track 1: 거미줄; Geomijul means a spider web
- Track 4: 땡; Ttaeng is onomatopoeia for tagging in the game freeze tag
- Track 6: 피어난다; Pieonanda means "bloom"

== Credits and personnel ==
Credits adapted from the EP's liner notes.

Musicians

- Stray Kids
  - Bang Chan (3Racha) – vocals (except 7), lyrics (except 7), composition (except 7), arrangement (except 3), all instruments (1, 7), computer programming (4, 5)
  - Changbin (3Racha) – vocals (except 6), lyrics (except 6), composition (except 6)
  - Han (3Racha) – vocals (except 6), lyrics (except 5, 6), composition (except 5, 6)
  - Lee Know – vocals (except 7), lyrics (6), composition (6)
  - Hyunjin – vocals (except 6), lyrics (7), composition (7)
  - Felix – vocals (except 6), lyrics (7), composition (7)
  - Seungmin – vocals (except 7), lyrics (6), composition (6)
  - I.N – vocals (except 7), lyrics (6), composition (6)
- DallasK – composition (1), arrangement (1)
- Versachoi – composition (2, 3), arrangement (2, 3), all instruments (2, 3)
- Trippy – composition (4), arrangement (4), synthesizer (4), drum (4), bass (4), computer programming (4)
- Jun2 – composition (5), arrangement (5), computer programming (5)
- Nickko Young – composition (6), arrangement (6), guitar (5, 6), drum (6)
- Kim Hong-seo – bass (6)
- Millionboy – composition (7), arrangement (7), all instruments (7)

Technical

- Lee Kyeong-won – digital editing (except 5,7)
- Bang Chan (3Racha) – digital editing (2, 3, 5, 7), recording (2, 3, 6, 7)
- Goo Hye-jin – recording (except 6,7)
- Lee Sang-yeop – recording (4)
- Lim Hong-jin – mixing (1, 7)
- Manny Marroquin – mixing (2)
- Yoon Won-kwon – mixing (3, 4)
- Shin Bong-won – mixing (5)
- Lee Tae-sub – mixing (6)
- Chris Galland – mix engineering (2)
- Ramiro Fernandez-Seoane – mix engineering assistant (2)
- Kwon Nam-woo – mastering (except 2)
- Dave Kutch – mastering (2)

Locations

- JYP Publishing (KOMCA) – original publishing (all), sub-publishing (1)
- Prescription Songs (ASCAP) – original publishing (1)
- Copyright Control – original publishing (6)
- AMRA – sub-publishing (1)
- JYPE Studios – recording (except 6, 7), mixing (1, 6, 7)
- Channie's "Room" – recording (1, 6, 7)
- Larrabee Studios – mixing (2)
- Studio DDeepKick – mixing (3, 4)
- Glab Studios – mixing (5)
- 821 Sound Mastering – mastering (except 2)
- The Mastering Palace – mastering (2)

== Charts ==
=== Weekly charts ===
Weekly chart performance for Oddinary
Chart (2022)	Peak position
Australian Albums (ARIA)	92
Austrian Albums (Ö3 Austria)	11
Belgian Albums (Ultratop Flanders)	5
Belgian Albums (Ultratop Wallonia)	5
Canadian Albums (Billboard)	20
Croatian International Albums (HDU)	1
Czech Albums (ČNS IFPI)	87
Danish Albums (Hitlisten)	3
Dutch Albums (Album Top 100)	12
Finnish Albums (Suomen virallinen lista)	1
French Physical Albums (SNEP)	55
German Albums (Offizielle Top 100)	43
Hungarian Albums (MAHASZ)	2
Italian Albums (FIMI)	48
Japanese Albums (Oricon)	4
Japanese Combined Albums (Oricon)	4
Japanese Hot Albums (Billboard Japan)	20
Lithuanian Albums (AGATA)	3
New Zealand Albums (RMNZ)	33
Polish Albums (ZPAV)	1
South Korean Albums (Gaon)	1
Spanish Albums (Promusicae)	48
Swedish Albums (Sverigetopplistan)	5
Swiss Albums (Schweizer Hitparade)	10
UK Albums (Official Charts)	95
UK Independent Albums (Official Charts)	34
US Billboard 200	1
US World Albums (Billboard)	1

=== Monthly charts ===
Monthly chart performance for Oddinary
Chart (2022)	Peak position
Japanese Albums (Oricon)	5
South Korean Albums (Gaon)	2
Uruguayan Albums (CUD)	2

=== Year-end charts ===
2022 year-end chart performance for Oddinary
Chart (2022)	Position
Belgian Albums (Ultratop Flanders)	124
Belgian Albums (Ultratop Wallonia)	133
Hungarian Albums (MAHASZ)	10
Global Albums (IFPI)	14
Japanese Albums (Oricon)	51
South Korean Albums (Circle)	9
US Top Album Sales (Billboard)	22
US World Albums (Billboard)	4

2023 year-end chart performance for Oddinary
Chart (2023)	Position
Hungarian Albums (MAHASZ)	44

== Certifications and sales ==
Certifications and sales figures for Oddinary
Region	Certification	Certified units/sales
Japan Physical	—	63,447
Japan Digital	—	1,017
South Korea (KMCA)	2× Million	2,218,221
United States	—	204,000

== Release history ==
Release dates and formats for Oddinary
Region	Date	Format	Version	Label	Ref.
Various	March 18, 2022	Digital download; streaming	Digital	JYP; Republic	
United States	March 18, 2022	CD	Limited; standard	JYP; Republic	
South Korea	March 18, 2022	CD	Limited; standard	JYP	
South Korea	March 28, 2022	CD	Jewel case	JYP	

== See also ==
- List of Billboard 200 number-one albums of 2022
- List of Gaon Album Chart number ones of 2022
- List of number-one albums of 2022 (Finland)
- List of number-one albums of 2022 (Poland)
