= Mixtape: Time Out =

Single by Stray Kids

from the album 5-Star
- Language: Korean; English
- Released: August 1, 2022
- Studio: Channie's "Room" (Seoul)
- Genre: Punk rock; pop rock
- Length: 2:55
- Label: JYP; Republic
- Composers: Bang Chan; Changbin; Han; Versachoi; Jun2
- Lyricists: Bang Chan; Changbin; Han

Stray Kids singles chronology
"Circus" (2022)	"Mixtape: Time Out" (2022)	"Case 143" (2022)

Music video
- "Mixtape: Time Out" on YouTube

"Mixtape: Time Out" is a song recorded by South Korean boy band Stray Kids. It was released on August 1, 2022, through JYP Entertainment and Republic Records as a standalone single. Written by Bang Chan, Changbin and Han from 3Racha, Versachoi, and Jun2, the song was released to commemorate the fourth anniversary of the group's fandom name announcement, named Stay, as part of their Mixtape Project, following "Mixtape: Gone Days", "Mixtape: On Track", and "Mixtape: Oh".

== Background and release ==
On July 26, 2022, Stray Kids announced the "2022 Stayweek", to commemorate the fourth anniversary of the fandom's name, "Stay", releasing special contents daily for a week, such as behind-the-scenes videos, and unseen photos, etc. On July 31, the group uploaded a video called "SKZ Time Out Talk Room", a chat room talking about their Gangwon-do trip and the new song inspired from it, revealing that they would be surprise-released the new single as a gift for their fans, titled "Mixtape: Time Out", on August 1, at midnight KST to digital music and streaming platforms. Later, the song was included on the group's third studio album 5-Star.

== Lyrics and composition ==
"Mixtape: Time Out" is described as a "fresh" and "energetic" upbeat punk rock and pop rock track, conveying a sense of freedom. 3Racha, Stray Kids' in-house production team (Bang Chan, Changbin, Han) wrote the song and co-composed with Versachoi, and Jun2 in the key of D major, 160 beats per minute with a running time of two minutes and 55 seconds. Lyrically, the song reminisces about Stray Kids' trip to Gangwon-do before beginning the promotion of their latest EP Oddinary. Additionally, the sea sounds in the song were recorded directly by the group from the Sea of Japan.

== Commercial performance ==
In South Korea, "Mixtape: Time Out" failed to chart on the main Circle Digital Chart, but peaked at number 29 on the Download Chart. Internationally, the song debuted at number 36 on the Oricon Digital Singles Chart, number 37 on the Billboard Japan Download Songs, number 17 on the Hungarian Single Top 40, and number four on the Billboard World Digital Song Sales.

== Music video ==
An accompanying music video for "Mixtape: Time Out" was uploaded on August 1, 2022, in conjunction with the song release. Directed by Jimmy, the music video shows Stray Kids enjoying a trip to the beach together, and lounging and playing in a nearby beach house.

== Credits and personnel ==
Personnel

- Stray Kids – vocals
  - Bang Chan (3Racha) – lyrics, composition, arrangement, recording
  - Changbin (3Racha) – lyrics, composition
  - Han (3Racha) – lyrics, composition
- Versachoi – composition, arrangement, drum, computer programming
- Jun2 – composition, arrangement
- Nickko Young – guitar
- Lee Jae-myung – bass
- Lee Kyeong-won – digital editing
- MasterKey – mixing
- Kwon Nam-woo – mastering

Locations

- JYP Publishing (KOMCA) – publishing
- Channie's "Room" – recording
- 821 Sound – mixing, mastering

== Charts ==
Chart performance for "Mixtape: Time Out"
Chart (2022–2023)	Peak position
Hungary (Single Top 40)	17
Japan Digital Singles (Oricon)	36
Japan Download (Billboard Japan)	37
South Korea Download (Circle)	29
US World Digital Song Sales (Billboard)	4

== Release history ==
Release history for "Mixtape: Time Out"
Region	Date	Format	Label	Ref.
Various	August 1, 2022	Digital download; streaming	JYP; Republic	
