= Idology =

South Korean music webzine

- Website type: Online magazine
- Available in: Korean
- Owners: Mimyo (미묘; Subtlety)
- Creator: Mimyo
- Website: idology.kr
- Launched: March 2014
- Current status: Active

Idology (Korean: 아이돌로지; RR: Aidolloji) is a South Korean music webzine specializing in idol criticism, founded by music expert Mimyo in 2014, and consists of about 10 writers. Mimyo, whose Korean name translates to "Subtlety", serves as the webzine's editor-in-chief. In October 2015, the average number of daily visitors was 18,000 to 25,000.

== Background ==
Idology opened in March 2014 by music expert and musician Mimyo (미묘; Subtlety), who is considered one of "the most authoritative among domestic idol experts". He is also the editor of South Korea's webzine Weiv, founded in 1999. He received a Ph.D. in musicology from Paris 8 University Vincennes-Saint-Denis and began writing about pop culture. The webzine specializes in coverage of K-pop idols in the South Korean music industry, as such coverage were not well covered by existing music webzines at the time. The website's writers, some of whom are musicians, publish articles about various topics.
