= List of songs written by Bang Chan =

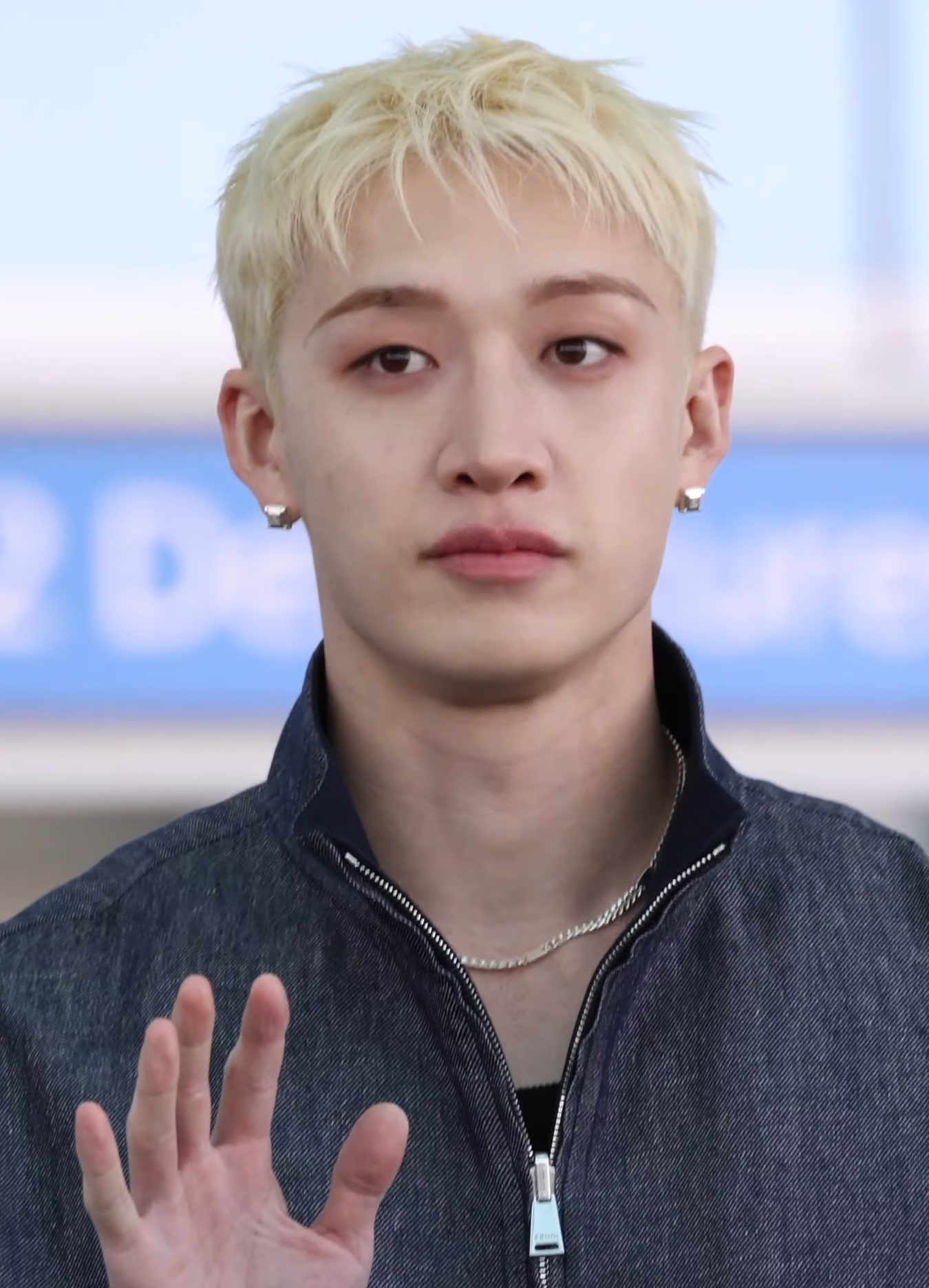
Bang Chan in February 2026

Australian singer, rapper, songwriter, and producer Christopher Chahn Bahng, known professionally as Bang Chan, is the leader of the South Korean boy band Stray Kids and a member of its hip-hop and production sub-unit, 3Racha. As of March 2026, he is credited with 236 songs registered with the Korea Music Copyright Association (KOMCA).

Since Stray Kids' debut under JYP Entertainment, Bang Chan has contributed much of the Stray Kids' discography, along with fellow bandmates Changbin and Han, which includes multiple No. 1 albums on the Billboard 200 and their first Billboard Hot 100 entry, "Lalalala".

Bang Chan was the sole lyricist for several Stray Kids' songs, including "24 to 25" from Christmas EveL, "Mixtape: Gone Days" and "Not!" from I Am Not, "Youtiful" from 5-Star, and "Haven" included in Go Live, which was ranked second on NME's 2022 list, "Every Stray Kids Song Ranked in Order of Greatness". In addition to his contributions to Stray Kids and composing solo tracks for his bandmates, Bang Chan has written and produced songs for television series such as Pop Out Boy!, Re:Revenge - In the End of Desire, and Tower of God, as well as for films like Doraemon: Nobita's Sky Utopia and Deadpool & Wolverine.

His songwriting and production credits extend to other artists, including NiziU, JO1, Yao Chen, and Show Lo, and collaborations with international musicians like Charlie Puth, Sky-Hi, Lil Durk, Tiger JK, and Japanese singer Lisa. Bang Chan received the Best Creator Award at the 2023 Asia Artist Awards for his work as a songwriter and producer.

== Songs ==
Key
†	Indicates single
#	Indicates a non-commercial release
‡	Indicates songs written solely by Bang Chan
⁂	Song available in Korean and Japanese

All song credits are sourced from the KOMCA database, unless stated otherwise.

Song title, original artist, album of release, and year of release
Song	Artist(s)	Lyricist(s)	Composer(s)	Album	Year	Ref.
"0325"	Stray Kids	Bang Chan, Changbin, Han	Bang Chan; Changbin; Han; Hong Ji-sang	I Am You	2018	
"0801" ‡	Stray Kids	Bang Chan	Bang Chan; Versachoi	Karma	2025	
"19"	Stray Kids	Han	Bang Chan; Han	Clé 1: Miroh	2019	
"24 to 25" ‡	Stray Kids	Bang Chan	Bang Chan; Nickko Young	Christmas EveL	2021	
"3Racha"	3Racha	Bang Chan, Changbin, Han	Bang Chan; Changbin; Han	Maxident	2022	
"3rd Eye"	Stray Kids	Bang Chan, Changbin, Han	Bang Chan; Changbin; Han; This N That	I Am Not	2018	
"4419"	Stray Kids	Bang Chan, Changbin, Han, Hyunjin, Seungmin	Bang Chan; Changbin; Han; RealBros (Ohwon Lee)	Mixtape	2018	
"Ai o Kureta no ni, Naze" (愛をくれたのに、なぜ Love is Painful)	Stray Kids	Bang Chan, Changbin, KM Markit	Changbin; Bang Chan; Kim Ju-hyeong	Giant	2024	
"Airplane" (비행기)	Stray Kids	Kang Dong Ha, Bang Chan, Changbin, Han, Kwon Tae-yang ($un), Young Chance	MosPick $un Young Chance; Bang Chan; Changbin	Go Live	2020	
"Alien" (외계인) #	Han	Han	Han; Bang Chan	SKZ-Replay	2021	
"All In" †	Stray Kids	Bang Chan, Changbin, Han, J.Y. Park "The Asiansoul", KM-Markit	J.Y. Park "The Asiansoul"; Bang Chan; Changbin; Han; Young Chance	All In (EP)	2020	
"All In" (Korean version)	Stray Kids	Bang Chan, Changbin, Han, J.Y. Park "The Asiansoul"	J.Y. Park "The Asiansoul"; Bang Chan; Changbin; Han	Non-album single	2020	
"All My Life" (Stray Kids remix)	Lil Durk featuring Stray Kids	Durk Banks; Jermaine Cole; Łukasz Gottwald; Rocco Valdes; Ryan Ogren; Gamal Lewis; Theron Thomas; Bang Chan; Changbin; Han		Almost Healed	2023	
"Another Day" (일상)	Stray Kids	Han	Han; Bang Chan	Go Live	2020	
"Anthem" #	Stray Kids	Bang Chan, Changbin, Han	Bang Chan; Changbin; Han	Non-album single (Note: Pilot : For 5-Star)	2023	
"Any" (아니)	Stray Kids	Bang Chan, Changbin, Han	Bang Chan; Changbin; Han; Matluck; Tele	In Life	2020	
"Astronaut"	Stray Kids	Bang Chan, Changbin, Han	Bang Chan; Changbin; Han; Lorenzo Cosi; YK Koi	Clé: Levanter	2019	
"Awaken"	Stray Kids	Bang Chan, Changbin, Han	Bang Chan; Changbin; Han; Kim Park Chella	I Am Not	2018	
"Awkward Silence" (갑자기 분위기 싸해질 필요 없잖아요)	Stray Kids	Bang Chan, Changbin, Han	Bang Chan; Changbin; Han; Time	I Am Who	2018	
"B Me"	Stray Kids	Bang Chan, Changbin, Han, Earattack	Bang Chan; Changbin; Han; Earattack	In Life	2020	
"Baby" ‡ #	Bang Chan	Bang Chan	Versachoi; Bang Chan	Unreleased song (Note: Performed on Stray Kids 5-Star Dome Tour)	2023	
"Back Door" † ⁂	Stray Kids	Bang Chan, Changbin, Han	Bang Chan; Changbin; Han; HotSauce	In Life; All In	2020	
"Back Door" (Loud version) #	Team JYP	Bang Chan, Changbin, Han	Bang Chan; Changbin; Han; HotSauce	Non-album single (Note: Loud Live Round -Final Debut-)	2021	
"Battle Ground"	Stray Kids	Bang Chan, Changbin, Han, KM Markit	Bang Chan; Changbin; Han; Frants	The Sound	2023	
"Battle Ground" (Korean version)	Stray Kids	Bang Chan, Changbin, Han	Bang Chan; Changbin; Han; Frants	Non-album single (Note: 5-Star Dome Tour 2023 Seoul Special (Unveil 13))	2023	
"Because" (좋으니까) #	Changbin, Felix	Changbin, Felix	Changbin; Bang Chan	SKZ-Replay	2021	
"Behind the Light" (그림자도 빛이 있어야 존재)	Stray Kids	Bang Chan, Changbin, Han, Hyunjin, Lee Know, Seungmin, I.N, Felix	Bang Chan; Lee Know; Changbin; Hyunjin; Han; Felix; Seungmin; I.N	SKZ2021	2021	
"Black Hole" #	Bang Chan, I.N	Bang Chan, I.N	Bang Chan; I.N; Nickko Young	SKZ-Record	2023	
"Bleep" (삐처리)	Stray Kids	Bang Chan, Changbin, Han	Bang Chan; Changbin; Han; Versachoi	Karma	2025	
"Blind Spot" (사각지대)	Stray Kids	Bang Chan, Changbin, Han	Bang Chan; Changbin; Han; Willie Weeks	Rock-Star	2023	
"Blueprint" (청사진)	Stray Kids	Lee Su-Ran, Bang Chan, Changbin, Han	Earattack; Eniac	Go Live	2020	
"Booster"	Stray Kids	Bang Chan, Changbin, Han	Christian Fast; Henrik Nordenback; Albin Nordqvist	Clé: Levanter	2019	
"Bounce Back"	Stray Kids	Bang Chan, Han	Versachoi; Bang Chan Han	Hop	2024	
"Boxer"	Stray Kids	Bang Chan, Changbin, Han	Bang Chan; Changbin; Han; Glory Face (Full8loom); Jake K (Full8loom)	Clé 1: Miroh	2019	
"Broken Compass"	Stray Kids	Bang Chan, Changbin, Han, Hyunjin, Lee Know, Seungmin, I.N, Felix	Bang Chan; Changbin; Han; Hyunjin; Lee Know; Seungmin; I.N; Felix	SKZ2021	2021	
"Butterflies"	Stray Kids	Versa Choi, Bang Chan, Yohei, D&H	Bang Chan; Versachoi	Social Path / Super Bowl (Japanese Ver.)	2023	
"Call" ⁂	Stray Kids	Han, KM-Markit	Han; Bang Chan	Scars" / "Thunderous" (Japanese ver.)	2021	
"Can I Call You" #	Changbin, Hyunjin	Hyunjin	Hyunjin; Bang Chan	Unreleased song	2024	
"Case 143" † ⁂	Stray Kids	Bang Chan, Changbin, Han	Bang Chan; Changbin; Han; Raphael (Producing Lab); Daviid (3Scape); Yosia (3Scape)	Maxident; The Sound (Note: The Japanese ver. was included in this album in 2023)	2022	
"Ceremony" (Note: Credits for all three versions of the song (Korean, English, & Festival)) †	Stray Kids	Bang Chan, Changbin, Han	Bang Chan; Changbin; Han; Versachoi	Karma	2025	
"Charmer"	Stray Kids	Bang Chan, Changbin, Han	Bang Chan; Changbin; Han; Versachoi	Oddinary	2022	
"Cheese"	Stray Kids	Bang Chan, Changbin, Han	Bang Chan; Changbin; Han; Versachoi	Noeasy	2021	
"Chill" (식혀) ⁂	Stray Kids	Bang Chan, Han	Han; Bang Chan	Maxident; The Sound	2022	
"Chk Chk Boom" † ⁂	Stray Kids	Bang Chan, Changbin, Han	Bang Chan; Changbin; Han; Dallas Koehlke; Ronnie Icon; BB Elliot	Ate; Giant	2024	
"Christmas EveL" †	Stray Kids	Bang Chan, Changbin, Han	Bang Chan; Changbin; Han; HotSauce	Christmas EveL	2021	
"Christmas Love"	Stray Kids	Bang Chan, Yohei	Bang Chan; Versachoi	Giant	2024	
"Chronosaurus"	Stray Kids	Bang Chan, Changbin, Han	Bang Chan; Changbin; Han; Kairos; SamUIL	Clé 1: Miroh	2019	
"Circus" †	Stray Kids	Bang Chan, Changbin, Han, KM Markit	Bang Chan; Changbin; Han; Earattack; Chan's (Take a Chance)	Circus	2022	
"Circus" (Korean version)	Stray Kids	Bang Chan, Changbin, Han	Bang Chan; Changbin; Han; Earattack; Chan's (Take a Chance)	Maxident	2022	
"Close" #	Han	Han	Han; Bang Chan	SKZ-Replay	2020	
"Comflex"	Stray Kids	Bang Chan, Changbin, Han	Bang Chan; Changbin; Han; Millionboy	Rock-Star	2023	
"Connected" ‡	Bang Chan	Bang Chan	Bang Chan; Versachoi	SKZ-Replay	2022	
"Contradicting" #	Hyunjin	Hyunjin	Hyunjin; Bang Chan	SKZ-Record track	2023	
"Cover Me"	Stray Kids	Bang Chan, Hyunjin	Hyunjin; Bang Chan; Nickko Young	Rock-Star	2023	
"Creed"	Stray Kids	Bang Chan, Changbin, Han	Bang Chan; Changbin; Han; Millionboy	Karma	2025	
"Cypher" #	Changbin	Changbin	Changbin; Bang Chan; Versachoi	SKZ-Record track	2020	
"District 9" †	Stray Kids	Bang Chan, Changbin, Han	Bang Chan; Changbin; Han; Trippy	I Am Not; Unveil Stray Kids	2018	
"DLMLU"	Stray Kids	Hyunjin, Yohei	Hyunjin; Bang Chan; Versachoi	The Sound	2023	
"Domino"	Stray Kids	Bang Chan, Changbin, Han	Bang Chan; Changbin; Han; Versachoi	Noeasy; Christmas EveL (Note: The English ver. was included in this album.)	2021	
"Don't Say" #	Han	Han	Versachoi; Bang Chan; Han	Unreleased song	2023	
"Double Knot" † ⁂	Stray Kids	Bang Chan, Changbin, Han	Bang Chan; Changbin; Han; Nick Furlong; DallasK	Clé: Levanter (Note: previously released by pre-debut 3Racha in 2017); Step Out of Clé (Note: The English version was released in this album); SKZ2020 (Note: The Japanese ver. was released in this album)	2019	
"Drive" #	Bang Chan and Lee Know	Bang Chan, Lee Know	Bang Chan; Taalthechoi	SKZ-Player	2021	
"Easy"	Stray Kids	Bang Chan, Changbin, Han	Bang Chan; Changbin; Han; Mike Daley; Mike J Henry Oyekanmi; Mitchell Owens	Go Live	2020	
"Eternity" ‡ #	Bang Chan	Bang Chan	Bang Chan; Nickko Young	Non-album single (Note: Released only on YouTube as part of SKZ-Record project.)	2024	
"Entrance"	Stray Kids	—N/a	Bang Chan; Kairos; SamUIL	Clé 1: Miroh	2019	
"Escape"	Bang Chan; Hyunjin	Bang Chan, Hyunjin	Bang Chan; Hyunjin; Versachoi	Mixtape: Dominate	2025	
"Ex"	Stray Kids	Bang Chan, Changbin	Bang Chan; Changbin; HotSauce	In Life	2020	
"Falling Up"	Stray Kids	Bang Chan, Changbin, KM Markit	Bang Chan; Changbin; Restart; Chae Gang-hae	Giant (Note: This song was also used as the ending theme song for Tower of God season 2)	2024	
"Falling Up" (English version)	Stray Kids	Bang Chan, Changbin	Bang Chan; Changbin; Restart; Chae Gang-hae	Giant	2024	
"Falling Up" (Korean version) †	Stray Kids	Bang Chan, Changbin	Bang Chan; Changbin; Restart; Chae Gang-hae	Tower of God Season 2 Battle OST	2024	
"Fam"	Stray Kids	Bang Chan, Changbin, Han, KM Markit	Bang Chan; Changbin; Han; Versachoi	All In	2020	
"Fam" (Korean version) #	Stray Kids	Bang Chan, Changbin, Han	Bang Chan; Changbin; Han; Versachoi	Non-album single (Note: STRAY KIDS 2ND WORLD SEOUL SPECIAL UNVEIL 11)	2022	
"FNF"	Stray Kids	Bang Chan, Felix	Bang Chan; Felix; Trippy	5-Star	2023	
"For You"	Stray Kids	Bang Chan, Changbin, Han, Hyunjin, Lee Know, Seungmin, I.N, Felix	Bang Chan; Changbin; Han; Hyunjin; Lee Know; Seungmin; I.N; Felix	SKZ2021	2021	
"Freeze" (땡)	Stray Kids	Bang Chan, Changbin, Han	Bang Chan; Changbin; Han; Trippy	Oddinary	2022	
"Get Cool"	Stray Kids	Inner Child, Bang Chan, Changbin, Han	Yoon Jong-sung (MonoTree); Inner Child (MonoTree); Song Ha-eun; Totem; Bang Chan; Changbin; Han	I Am You; Unveil Stray Kids	2018	
"Ghost"	Stray Kids	Bang Chan, Changbin	Bang Chan; Changbin; Versachoi	Karma	2025	
"Giant" †	Stray Kids	Bang Chan, Changbin, Han, Yohei	Bang Chan; Changbin; Han; Restart; Chae Kang-hae	Giant	2024	
"Give Me Your TMI"	Stray Kids	Bang Chan, Changbin, Han	Bang Chan; Changbin; Han; Tak; 1Take	Maxident	2022	
"Glow"	Stray Kids	Changbin, Felix, Lee Know	Bang Chan; This N That	Mixtape	2018	
"Go Live" (GO生)	Stray Kids	Bang Chan, Changbin, Han	Bang Chan; Changbin; Han; Amanda MNDR Warner; Peter Wade Keusch	Go Live	2020	
"God's Menu" (神메뉴; 神メニュー) † ⁂	Stray Kids	Bang Chan, Changbin, Han	Bang Chan; Changbin; Han; Versachoi	Go Live; All In (Note: The Japanese version was included in this album)	2020	
"Goodbye" ‡ #	Seungmin	Bang Chan	Versachoi; Bang Chan	Non-album single (Note: Released only on YouTube as part of SKZ-Record project.)	2025	
"Grow Up"	Stray Kids	Bang Chan, Changbin, Han	Bang Chan; Changbin; Han; Trippy	I Am Not; Unveil Stray Kids	2018	
"Grr" (총량의법칙)	Stray Kids	Bang Chan, Changbin, Han	Bang Chan; Changbin; Han; Armadillo; Trippy; 1Take	Mixtape	2018	
"Half Time" (반전)	Stray Kids	Bang Chan, Changbin, Han	Bang Chan; Changbin; Han; Versachoi	Karma	2025	
"Hall of Fame" (위인전)	Stray Kids	Bang Chan, Changbin, Han	Bang Chan; Changbin; Han; Versachoi	5-Star	2023	
"Happy" #	Han	Han	Han; Bang Chan	SKZ-Replay	2021	
"Haven" ‡	Stray Kids	Bang Chan	Bang Chan; Versachoi	Go Live	2020	
"Hellevator" †	Stray Kids	Armadilo, Bang Chan, Changbin, Han	Armadillo; Bang Chan; Changbin; Han; Rangga	Mixtape; Unveil Stray Kids	2017	
"Hello Stranger"	Stray Kids	Bang Chan, Changbin, Han	Bang Chan; Changbin; Han; Hong Ji-sang	Pop Out Boy! OST Part 1	2020	
"Hero's Soup" (해장국)	Stray Kids	Bang Chan, Changbin, Han	Bang Chan; Changbin; Han; Lee Hae-sol	I Am You	2018	
"Heyday" (Prod. Czaer)	3Racha	Bang Chan, Changbin, Han	Czaer; MarkAlong; Stephen Lee; Bashment YC; Owo; Bang Chan; Changbin; Han	Street Man Fighter Original Vol. 4 (Crew Songs)	2022	
"Hollow"†	Stray Kids	Bang Chan, Changbin, Han, KM-Markit (Note: Signifies a Japanese lyricist)	Bang Chan; Changbin; Han; Versachoi	Hollow	2025	
"Hold On" #	Seungmin	Han	Han; Bang Chan; Versachoi	SKZ-Record track	2023	
"Hug Me" (안아줄게요)	I.N	I.N	I.N; Bang Chan; Nickko Young	SKZ-Replay	2022	
"Hoodie Season"	Stray Kids	Bang Chan, Changbin, Han, Hyunjin, Lee Know, Seungmin, I.N, Felix	Bang Chan; Changbin; Han; Hyunjin; Lee Know eungmin I.N; Felix	SKZ2021	2021	
"I Am You" †	Stray Kids	Bang Chan, Changbin, Han	Bang Chan; Changbin; Han; Lee Woo-min "Collapsedone"; Justin Reinstein; KZ; Zene The Zilla	I Am You; Unveil Stray Kids	2018	
"I Got It" #	Han	Han	Han; Bang Chan	SKZ-Replay	2020	
"I Hate to Admit" (인정하기 싫어) ‡ #	Bang Chan	Bang Chan	Bang Chan	SKZ-Replay	2020	
"I Like It"	Stray Kids	Bang Chan, Changbin, Han, JBach	Bang Chan; Changbin; Han; Nathan Cunningham; Marc Sibley; JBach	Ate	2024	
"Ice Americano" #	Lee Know, Han	Lee Know, Han	Lee Know; Han; Bang Chan	SKZ-Record track	2020	
"Ice.Cream" #	Hyunjin	Hyunjin	Hyunjin; Bang Chan	SKZ-Replay	2022	
"In My Head"	Stray Kids	Bang Chan, Changbin	Bang Chan; Changbin; Jun2	Karma	2025	
"Insomnia" (불면증)	Stray Kids	Bang Chan, Changbin, Han	Bang Chan; Changbin; Han; KZ; Space One	I Am Who	2018	
"Item"	Stray Kids	Bang Chan, Changbin, Han	Bang Chan; Changbin; Han; Versachoi	5-Star	2023	
"Jjam"	Stray Kids	Bang Chan, Changbin	Bang Chan; Changbin; Restart; Chae Gang-hae	Ate	2024	
"Just a Little"	Stray Kids	Han, KM-Markit	Han; Bang Chan	Hollow	2025	
"Just Breathe" †	Sky-Hi, 3Racha	Bang Chan, Changbin, Han, Sky-Hi	Bang Chan; Changbin; Han; Sky-Hi	The Debut	2022	
"King of Nagging" (잔소리 대마왕) #	Hyunjin, Seungmin	Hyunjin, Seungmin	Hyunjin; Seungmin; Bang Chan	SKZ-Record track	2020	
"Lalalala" (락 (樂)) †	Stray Kids	Bang Chan, Changbin, Han	Bang Chan; Changbin; Han; Versachoi; Kevin Gomringer; Tim Gomringer; Luis Bacque	Rock-Star	2023	
"Lalalala" (Rock version)	Stray Kids	Bang Chan, Changbin, Han	Bang Chan; Changbin; Han; Versachoi; Kevin Gomringer; Tim Gomringer; Luis Bacque	Rock-Star	2023	
"Leave"	Stray Kids	Bang Chan, Changbin	Bang Chan; Changbin; Jun2	Rock-Star	2023	
"Levanter" †	Stray Kids	Bang Chan, Changbin, Han, JYP, Herz Analog	Bang Chan; Changbin; Han; Hong Ji-sang	Clé: Levanter; Step Out of Clé (Note: The English ver. was included in this album); SKZ2020 (Note: The Japanese ver. was included in this album)	2019	
"Lonely St."	Stray Kids	Bang Chan, Changbin	Bang Chan; Changbin; Jun2	Oddinary	2022	
"Lose My Breath" ((featuring Charlie Puth) version) †	Stray Kids & Charlie Puth	Bang Chan, Changbin, Han, Hindlin Jacob Kasher, Charlie Puth, Salomon Naliya	Charlie Puth; Bang Chan; Changbin; Han; Johnny Goldstein	Non-album single	2024	
"Lose My Breath" (Stray Kids version)†	Stray Kids	Bang Chan, Changbin, Han, Hindlin Jacob Kasher, Charlie Puth, Salomon Naliya	Charlie Puth; Bang Chan; Changbin; Han; Johnny Goldstein	Non-album single	2024	
"Lost Me"	Stray Kids	Changbin, Sunny Boy	Changbin; Bang Chan; Versachoi	The Sound	2023	
"Love Untold"	Hyunjin	Hyunjin	Hyunjin; Bang Chan	SKZ-Replay	2022	
"M.I.A."	Stray Kids	Bang Chan, Changbin, Han	Bang Chan; Changbin; Han; Kim Mong-e	I Am Who	2018	
"Maknae on Top" (막내온탑) #	I.N	Bang Chan, Changbin, I.N	Bang Chan	SKZ-Player	2021	
"Maniac" † ⁂	Stray Kids	Bang Chan, Changbin, Han	Bang Chan; Changbin; Han; Versachoi	Oddinary; Circus (Note: The Japanese ver. was released in this album)	2022	
"Matryoshka" #	3Racha	Bang Chan, Changbin, Han	Bang Chan; Changbin; Han	Non-album single (Note: Performed during Stray Kids reality show Ep. 6)	2017	
"Maze of Memories" (잠깐의 고요)	Stray Kids	Bang Chan, Changbin, Han	Bang Chan; Changbin; Han; J;Key	Clé 1: Miroh	2019	
"Megaverse"	Stray Kids	Bang Chan, Changbin, Han	Bang Chan; Changbin; Han; Versachoi	Rock-Star	2023	
"Mess" (엉망)	Stray Kids	Han, Bang Chan	Han; Bang Chan; Millionboy	Karma	2025	
"Miroh" †	Stray Kids	Bang Chan, Changbin, Han	Bang Chan; Changbin; Han; Brian Atwood	Clé 1: Miroh; Unveil Stray Kids	2019	
"Mirror"	Stray Kids	Bang Chan, Changbin, Han	Bang Chan; Changbin; Han; Lee Woo-min "Collapsedone"; Fredrik "Fredro" Ödesjö	I Am Not	2018	
"Mixtape#1"	Stray Kids	Bang Chan, Changbin, Han, Hyunjin, Lee Know, Seungmin, I.N, Felix, Woojin	Bang Chan; Changbin; Han; Hyunjin; Lee Know; Seungmin; I.N; Felix; Woojin	I Am Not; Clé 2: Yellow Wood (Note: Later was included in the album in 2019.)	2018	
"Mixtape#2"	Stray Kids	Bang Chan, Changbin, Han, Hyunjin, Lee Know, Seungmin, I.N, Felix, Woojin	Bang Chan; Changbin; Han; Hyunjin; Lee Know; Seungmin; I.N; Felix; Woojin	I Am Who; Clé 2: Yellow Wood (Note: Later was included in this album in 2019.)	2018	
"Mixtape#3"	Stray Kids	Bang Chan, Changbin, Han, Hyunjin, Lee Know, Seungmin, I.N, Felix, Woojin	Bang Chan; Changbin; Han; Hyunjin; Lee Know; Seungmin; I.N; Felix; Woojin	I Am You; Clé 2: Yellow Wood (Note: Later was included in this album in 2019.)	2018	
"Mixtape#4"	Stray Kids	Bang Chan, Changbin, Han, Hyunjin, Lee Know, Seungmin, I.N, Felix, Woojin	Bang Chan; Changbin; Han; Hyunjin; Lee Know; Seungmin; I.N; Felix; Woojin	Clé 1: Miroh; Clé 2: Yellow Wood (Note: Later was included in this album in 2019.)	2019	
"Mixtape#5"	Stray Kids	Bang Chan, Changbin, Han, Hyunjin, Lee Know, Seungmin, I.N, Felix	Bang Chan; Changbin; Han; Hyunjin; Lee Know; Seungmin; I.N; Felix	Clé: Levanter	2019	
"Mixtape: Gone Days" ‡ †	Stray Kids	Bang Chan	Bang Chan; Trippy	Non-album single (Note: Later was included in the album Go Live in 2020)	2019	
"Mixtape: Oh" (애)†	Stray Kids	Bang Chan, Changbin, Han	Bang Chan; Changbin; Han; Kobee; Holy M	Non-album single (Note: Later was included in the album Noeasy)	2021	
"Mixtape: Time Out" †	Stray Kids	Bang Chan, Changbin, Han	Bang Chan; Changbin; Han; Versachoi; Jun2	Non-album single (Note: Released on YouTube and YouTube Music only in 2022, but later got included in Stray Kids' 5-Star album)	2022	
"Mountains"	Stray Kids	Bang Chan, Changbin, Han	Bang Chan; Changbin; Han; Versachoi	Ate	2024	
"My Pace" † ⁂	Stray Kids	Bang Chan, Changbin, Han, JYP	Bang Chan; Changbin; Han; Earattack; Larmook	I Am Who; Unveil Stray Kids; SKZ2020 (Note: The Japanese ver. was included in this album)	2018	
"My Side" (편)	Stray Kids	Bang Chan, Changbin, Han	Bang Chan; Changbin; Han; Frants	I Am You	2018	
"N/S" (극과 극)	Stray Kids	Bang Chan, Changbin, Han	Bang Chan; Changbin; Han; Slo	I Am You	2018	
"Never Alone"	Stray Kids	Bang Chan, Changbin, Han, Yohei	Bang Chan; Changbin; Han; Versachoi	Hollow	2025	
"Nevermind"	Yao Chen	Blazo	Bang Chan; Changbin; Han	Non-album single	2021	
"Night"	Stray Kids	Bang Chan, Changbin, Han, D&H (Purple Night)	Bang Chan; Changbin; Han; Versachoi	Giant (Note: This song was also used as the opening theme song for Tower of God season 2)	2024	
"Night" (Korean version) †	Stray Kids	Bang Chan, Changbin, Han	Bang Chan; Changbin; Han; Versachoi	Tower of God Season 2 Battle OST	2024	
"Night" (English version)	Stray Kids	Bang Chan, Changbin, Han	Bang Chan; Changbin; Han; Versachoi	Giant	2024	
"Not!" ‡	Bang Chan, Lee Know, and Seungmin	Bang Chan	Bang Chan; Hong Ji-sang	I Am Not	2018	
"Novel"	Stray Kids	Seungmin, KM-Markit	Seungmin; Bang Chan; Nickko Young	The Sound	2023	
"One Day"	Stray Kids	Changbin, Lee Joon-seok, KM-Markit	Changbin; Bang Chan; Lee Joon-seok	All In	2020	
"One More Time" (한 장 더) #	Bang Chan, Felix	Bang Chan, Felix	Bang Chan; Felix	SKZ-Record track	2020	
"Pacemaker"	Stray Kids	Bang Chan, Changbin, Han, Jinli (Full8loom)	Bang Chan; Changbin; Han; Jinri (Full8loom); Glory Face (Full8loom); Jake (ARTiffect)	Go Live	2020	
"Parade"	Stray Kids	Bang Chan, Changbin, Han, KM-Markit	Bang Chan; Changbin; Han; Millionboy	Hollow	2025	
"Paradise"	NiziU	Bang Chan, Changbin, Han, Akira	Bang Chan; Changbin; Han	Doraemon: Nobita's Sky Utopia; Coconut	2023	
"Paradise" (Korean version)	NiziU	Bang Chan, Changbin, Han, Akira	Bang Chan; Changbin; Han	Press Play	2023	
"Phobia"	Stray Kids	Bang Chan, Versa Choi, Changbin, Han	Versachoi; Albin Nordqvist	Go Live	2020	
"Phoenix"	Stray Kids	Bang Chan, Changbin, Han	Bang Chan; Changbin; Han; Ronnie Icon; DallasK	Karma	2025	
"Placebo"	Stray Kids	Bang Chan, Changbin, Han, Hyunjin, Lee Know, Seungmin, I.N, Felix	Bang Chan; Changbin; Han; Hyunjin; Lee Know; Seungmin; I.N; Felix	SKZ2021	2021	
"Playing with Colours" (물감놀이)	3Racha, Lee Min-hyuk, Hongjoong	Lee Min-hyuk, Bang Chan, Changbin, Han, Hong-joong	Lee Min-hyuk; Bang Chan; Changbin; Han; Hong-joong	Non-album single (Note: Performed during Kingdom: Legendary War Round 1 Part.1)	2021	
"Piece of a Puzzle" (조각) #	Changbin, Seungmin	Changbin, Seungmin	Changbin; Seungmin; Bang Chan	SKZ-Replay	2021	
"Question"	Stray Kids	Bang Chan, Changbin, Han	Bang Chan; Changbin; Han; HotSauce	I Am Who	2018	
"Railway" ‡	Bang Chan	Bang Chan	Versachoi; Bang Chan	Hop (Note: The song was first performed during the Dominate World Tour)	2024	
"Red Lights"	Bang Chan and Hyunjin	Bang Chan, Hyunjin	Bang Chan; Hyunjin	Noeasy	2021	
"Rev It Up" #	Felix	Felix	Versachoi; Bang Chan; Felix	Unreleased song	2023	
"Road Not Taken"(밟힌 적 없는 길)	Stray Kids	Bang Chan, Changbin, Han	Matthew Tishler; Andrew; Underberg; Crash Cove	Clé 2: Yellow Wood	2019	
"Rock" (돌)	Stray Kids	Bang Chan, Changbin, Han	Bang Chan; Changbin; Han; Glory Face (Full8loom)	I Am Not	2018	
"Roman Empire" #	Bang Chan	Bang Chan; Taalthechoi	Taalthechoi; Bang Chan	SKZ-Record track	2025	
"Run"	Han	Han	Han; Bang Chan	SKZ-Replay	2022	
"Runners"	Stray Kids	Bang Chan, Felix	Bang Chan; Felix; Versachoi	Ate	2024	
"Runner's High"	3Racha	Bang Chan, Changbin, Han	Bang Chan; Changbin; Han	Non-album single (Note: Performed during Stray Kids reality show Ep. 1)	2017	
"S-Class" †	Stray Kids	Bang Chan, Changbin, Han	Bang Chan; Changbin; Han; Chae Gang-hae; Restart	5-Star	2023	
"Saiyan"	Stray Kids	Bang Chan, Han, KM-Markit	Han; Bang Chan; Versachoi	Giant	2024	
"Scars" (Japanese version)	Stray Kids	Bang Chan, Changbin, Han, KM Markit	Armadillo; Bang Chan; Changbin; Han	The Sound	2021	
"Scars" (Korean version) †	Stray Kids	Bang Chan, Changbin, Han	Armadillo; Bang Chan; Changbin; Han	SKZ2021	2021	
"School Life"	Stray Kids	Lim Jeong-seok, Bang Chan, Changbin, Han, Woojin, I.N	Brandon P. Lowry; Tobias Karlsson; Matthew Engst; Han; Woojin; Sangmi Kim	Mixtape	2018	
"Sensitive Boss" (Yeah민Boss) #	Changbin, I.N	Changbin, I.N	Changbin; I.N; Bang Chan	SKZ-Record track	2020	
"Side Effects" †	Stray Kids	Bang Chan, Changbin, Han	Bang Chan; Changbin; Han; Tak; 1Take	Clé 2: Yellow Wood; Unveil Stray Kids	2019	
"Silent Cry" ⁂	Stray Kids	Bang Chan, Changbin, Han	Bang Chan; Changbin; Han; Hong Ji-sang	Noeasy; Circus (Note: Later the Japanese ver. was included in this album in 2022.)	2021	
"SKZ Anthem" #	Stray Kids	Bang Chan, Changbin, Han	Bang Chan; Changbin; Han	Non-album single (Note: Opening anthem for Stray Kids concerts from 2018 until 2023)	2018	
"Slash"	Stray Kids	Bang Chan, Changbin, Han	Bang Chan; Changbin; Han; Versachoi	Deadpool & Wolverine	2024	
"Slump"	Stray Kids	Han, (KM-Markit), (Note: Contributed only in the Japanese version of the song) Bang Chan, (Note: Contributed only in the English version of the song) Sophia Pae (Note: Contributed only in the English version of the song)	Han; Bang Chan	Go Live; All In; Tower of God ED	2020	
"Social Path" (Featuring Lisa) †	Stray Kids and Lisa	Bang Chan, Changbin, Han, Yohei	Bang Chan; Changbin; Han; Versachoi	Social Path / Super Bowl (Japanese Ver.)	2023	
"Social Path" (Korean version featuring Lisa)	Stray Kids and Lisa	Bang Chan, Changbin, Han	Bang Chan; Changbin; Han; Versachoi	Rock-Star	2023	
"The Sound" †	Stray Kids	Bang Chan, Changbin, Han, D&H, Chris Larocca	Bang Chan; Changbin; Han; Zack Djurich; Kyle Reynolds; Chris LaRocca	The Sound	2023	
"The Sound" (Korean version)	Stray Kids	Bang Chan, Changbin, Han	Bang Chan; Changbin; Han; Zack Djurich; Kyle Reynolds; Chris LaRocca	5-Star	2023	
"Spread My Wings" (어린 날개)	Stray Kids	Bang Chan, Changbin, Han	Bang Chan; Changbin; Han; Trippy	Mixtape	2018	
"Ssick"	Stray Kids	Bang Chan, Changbin, Han	Bang Chan; Changbin; Han; ByHVN (153/Joombas)	Noeasy	2021	
"Star Lost"	Stray Kids	Bang Chan, Changbin, Han, Kalos, Earattack	Earattack; DaviDior	Noeasy	2021	
"Stop"	Stray Kids	Bang Chan, Changbin, Han	Bang Chan; Changbin; Han; Matthew Tishler; Andrew Underberg; Crash Cove	Clé: Levanter	2019	
"Stray Kids"	Stray Kids	Bang Chan, Changbin, Han	Bang Chan; Changbin; Han; DallasK; Ronnie Icon	Ate	2024	
"Streetlight" #	Changbin featuring Bang Chan	Changbin	Changbin; Bang Chan	SKZ-Replay	2020	
"Super Board"	Stray Kids	Bang Chan, Changbin, Han	Bang Chan; Changbin; Han; Kim Park Chella	Maxident	2022	
"Super Bowl" † ⁂	Stray Kids	Bang Chan, Changbin, Han, Felix	Bang Chan; Changbin; Han; Zack Djurich	5-Star; Social Path / Super Bowl (Japanese Ver.)	2023	
"Ta" (타)	Stray Kids	Bang Chan, Changbin, Han	Bang Chan; Changbin; Han; Lee Hae-sol	Go Live	2020	
"Taste"	Hyunjin, Felix, Lee Know	Hyunjin, Felix, Lee Know	Bang Chan; Hyunjin; Felix; Lee Know	Maxident	2022	
"There"	Stray Kids	Bang Chan, Changbin, KM Markit	Bang Chan; Changbin; Jun2	The Sound	2023	
"Thunderous" † ⁂	Stray Kids	Bang Chan, Changbin, Han	Bang Chan; Changbin; Han; HotSauce	Noeasy; The Sound	2021	
"TMT" (별생각)	Stray Kids	Bang Chan, Changbin, Han	Bang Chan; Changbin; Han; Time; Gravvity	Clé 2: Yellow Wood	2019	
"Top" †	Stray Kids	Armadilo, Bang Chan, Changbin, Han, KM Markit	Armadillo; Bang Chan; Changbin; Han; Rangga; Gwon Yeong-chan	All In (Note: The Japanese version was included in this EP and the English ver. was released as a single on May 20, 2020.)	2020	
"Top" (Korean version)†	Stray Kids	Armadilo, Bang Chan, Changbin, Han, KM Markit	Armadillo; Bang Chan; Changbin; Han; Rangga; Gwon Yeong-chan	Tower of God OST; Go Live	2020	
"Topline" (featuring Tiger JK)	Stray Kids, Tiger JK	Bang Chan, Changbin, Han, Tiger JK	Bang Chan; Changbin; Han; Versachoi	5-Star	2023	
"The Tortoise and the Hare"	Stray Kids	Bang Chan, Changbin, Han	Bang Chan; Changbin; Han; Amanda MNDR Warner; Peter Wade Keusch	In Life	2020	
"U" featuring Tablo	Stray Kids and Tablo	Bang Chan, Changbin, Han, Tablo, JBach	Bang Chan; Changbin; Han; JBach; Marc Sibley; Nathan Cunningham	Hop	2024	
"Up All Night" #	Bang Chan, Changbin, Felix, Seungmin	Bang Chan, Changbin	Bang Chan; Nick Lee; Josh Wei	SKZ-Replay	2022	
"Venom" (거미줄) ⁂	Stray Kids	Bang Chan, Changbin, Han	Bang Chan; Changbin; Han; DallasK	Oddinary; Circus	2022	
"The View"	Stray Kids	Bang Chan, Changbin, Han, Krysta Youngs	Bang Chan; Changbin; Han; TELYKast; Krysta Youngs	Noeasy	2021	
"Victory Song"	Stray Kids	Bang Chan, Changbin, Han	Bang Chan; Changbin; Han; Earattack; Larmook	Clé 1: Miroh; Unveil Stray Kids	2019	
"Voices"	Stray Kids	Bang Chan, Changbin, Han	Bang Chan; Changbin; Han; Trippy	I Am Who	2019	
"Volcano" #	Han	Han	Han; Bang Chan	SKZ-Record track	2023	
"Waiting for Us" (피어난다)	Bang Chan, Lee Know, Seungmin, I.N	Bang Chan, Lee Know, Seungmin, I.N	Bang Chan; Lee Know; Seungmin; I.N; Nickko Young	Oddinary	2022	
"Walkin on Water" †	Stray Kids	Bang Chan, Changbin, Han	Bang Chan; Changbin; Han; Restart; Chae Gang-hae	Hop	2024	
"Walkin on Water" (Hip version)	Stray Kids	Bang Chan, Changbin, Han	Bang Chan; Changbin; Han; Restart; Chae Gang-hae	Hop	2024	
"We Go"	3Racha	Bang Chan, Changbin, Han	Bang Chan; Changbin; Han; Nick Furlong; DallasK	In Life	2020	
"Why?"	Stray Kids	Bang Chan, Changbin, Han, Yohei, D&H	Bang Chan; Changbin; Han; Hong Ji-sang	Re:Revenge- In the End of Desire OST; Giant	2024	
"Wo De Shi Dai"	Show Lo	Bang Chan, Changbin, Han	Bang Chan; Changbin; Han	No Idea	2019	
"Wish You Back" #	Han	Han	Han; Bang Chan	SKZ-Replay	2021	
"Wolfgang"	Stray Kids	Bang Chan, Changbin, Han	Bang Chan; Changbin; Han; Versachoi	Kingdom: Legendary War (Note: performed in the "Finale: Who Is the King?"); Noeasy	2021	
"Yayaya"	Stray Kids	Bang Chan, Changbin, Han, Ahn Tae Seok	Earattack; Bang Chan; Changbin; Han	Mixtape	2018	
"Yeah" #	3Racha	Bang Chan, Changbin, Han	Bang Chan; Changbin; Han	Non-album single (Note: Performed during KCON 2022 LA)	2022	
"Yolo-Konde"	JO1	JO1	Bang Chan; Changbin; Han	Non-album single	2022	
"You Can Stay"	Stray Kids	Bang Chan, Changbin, Han	Bang Chan; Changbin; Han; Cook Classics	Clé: Levanter	2019	
"Your Eyes" †	Stray Kids	Bang Chan, Changbin, Han, KM Markit	Bang Chan; Changbin; Jun2	Circus	2022	
"Youtiful" ‡	Stray Kids	Bang Chan	Bang Chan; Nickko Young	5-Star	2023	
"Zone" #	Bang Chan, Changbin, Han	Bang Chan, Changbin, Han	Bang Chan; Changbin; Han	SKZ-Replay	2022	

== See also ==
- List of songs recorded by Stray Kids
