= Dominate World Tour =

2024–2025 concert tour by Stray Kids

- World tour by Stray Kids
- Seoul promotional poster
- Location: Asia; Australia; Latin America; North America; Europe
- Associated albums: Ate; Giant; Hop; Mixtape: Dominate; Hollow; Karma
- Start date: August 24, 2024
- End date: October 19, 2025
- Duration: c. 180 minutes
- Legs: 7
- No. of shows: 56
- Website: straykidsworldtour.com

Stray Kids concert chronology
- 5-Star Dome Tour (2023); Dominate World Tour (2024–2025); Run It World Tour (2026–2027)

The Dominate World Tour (stylized as Stray Kids World Tour <dominATE>) was the third world tour and fourth overall concert tour by South Korean boy band Stray Kids in support of their ninth Korean-language extended play Ate (2024), second Japanese-language studio album Giant (2024), first mixtape Hop (2024), single album Mixtape: Dominate (2025), and fourth Japanese-language EP Hollow (2025). The original tour began in Seoul, South Korea, on August 24, 2024, and concluded in Rome, Italy, on July 30, 2025. They traveled in Asia, Australia, Latin America, North America, and Europe.

The encore edition of the Dominate World Tour to support Stray Kids' Korean-language fourth studio album Karma, titled Dominate: Celebrate (stylized as dominATE: celebrATE) was held in Incheon on October 18 and 19, 2025. The concert film, titled Stray Kids: The Dominate Experience, filmed at SoFi Stadium, Inglewood, premiered on February 6, 2026.

== Background and promotion ==
Stray Kids uploaded the video "Step Out 2024" to their social media on January 1, 2024, outlining their accomplishments in 2023 and plans for the next year, including a world tour. In May, during Stray Kids and American fashion designer Tommy Hilfiger interview at the 2024 Met Gala, Hilfiger accidentally revealed that the group would go on a 40-city tour. Later, they confirmed the tour during an appearance at Good Morning America a few days later.

The world tour, titled Dominate, was formally announced on July 8, alongside the first Asia and Australia leg shows from August 2024 to January 2025, as well as teasing the upcoming shows in Latin America, North America, and Europe. According to JYP Entertainment, the tour title "Dominate" referred to "Stray Kids' unique ambition and determination as 'global top artists' who will dominate the stage." On November 19, the group added the addition 20 tour dates across Latin America, North America, and Europe from March to July 2025. The show at Rogers Stadium in Toronto marked the group the first ever act to perform at the venue. Due to overwhelming demand, additional show dates for New York, Los Angeles, and Mexico City were added on November 23, and London, Paris, Santiago, and São Paulo four days later.

Stray Kids uploaded the video "Step Out 2025" to their social media on January 6, 2025. It outlined their accomplishments in 2024 and plans for the upcoming year, revealing that the group would hold its encore concert in Seoul in 2025. On January 30, Stray Kids announced additional dates for Arlington and Madrid (the latter being subsequently cancelled), and added two new stops, which are four dates for Shizuoka, Japan and one date for Rome, Italy. On September 5, Stray Kids announced the encore concert, subtitled Celebrate, set to hold on October 18 and 19 at Incheon Asiad Main Stadium, Incheon.

To commemorate the Dominate World Tour, Stray Kids and nonprofit organization Musicians on Call lighted the Empire State Building to celebrate the healing power of music. The band also collaborated with Tottenham Hotspur Football Club for limited-edition jersey.

== Concert synopsis ==
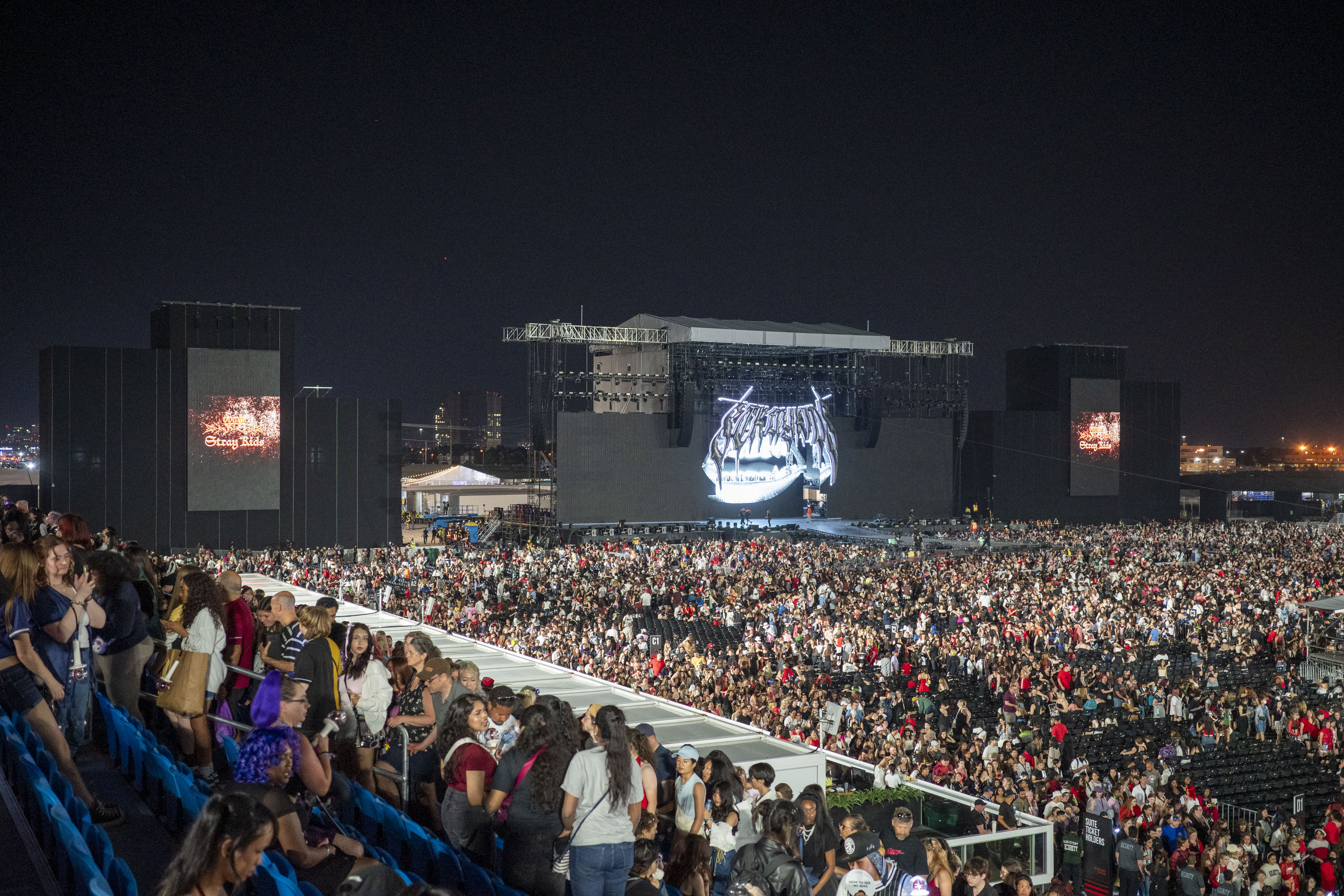
A stage of Dominate World Tour inaugural concert at Rogers Stadium, Toronto.

The Dominate show is around three hours long, beginning with Stray Kids, wearing beige and white glittering outfits inspired by Greek and Roman draping, performing "Mountains", "Thunderous", and "Jjam". Following the group welcoming to the concerts, it is continued by "District 9", and "Back Door", which the latter utilizes rollable doors on the stage. It is followed by four members premiering each of their then-unreleased tracks: Han's "Hold My Hand", Lee Know's "Youth", Seungmin's "As We Are", and Hyunjin's "So Good".

In the second act, the group arrives to the stage in a black classic car to perform "Chk Chk Boom", "Topline", "Super Bowl", "Comflex", "Lalalala", "Twilight", "Lonely St.", and the Korean version of "Social Path". The show continues by the other four members' solos: Bang Chan's "Railway", I.N's "Hallucination", Felix's "Unfair", and Changbin's "Ultra". The final act includes "Get Lit", "Item", "Domino", "God's Menu", "S-Class", "Venom", and concludes with "Maniac". Stray Kids end the concert with an encore from "I Like It", "Case 143", "My Pace", "Stray Kids", "Miroh", the Festival version of "Chk Chk Boom", "Star Lost", and "Haven".

Starting in Latin American leg, Stray Kids revamped the setlist in March 2025, including some songs such as "Giant" (Korean version), "Walkin on Water", and sub-unit tracks—Changbin and I.N's "Burnin' Tires", Han and Felix's "Truman", Bang Chan and Hyunjin's "Escape", and Lee Know and Seungmin's "Cinema"—replacing individual performances, etc.

== Critical reception ==
Hwang Hye-jin from Newsen praised the members in the Dominate tour for proving their excellent stage management skills by diligently moving around the center stage, the raised stage, and even the two sides, based on the experience they gained through the Japanese dome and North American stadium performances during their second tour. Writing for The Straits Times, Joanne Soh called the Singapore show the "commanding presence, high energy and elaborate numbers that were heavy on theatrics," and Ashley Cheah from HallyuSG noted the camera works, live band, members' solo stages, and performance details as the four highlights of the show.

== Commercial performance ==
Researcher Lee Hyun-ji from Eugene Investment & Securities predicted that the Dominate World Tour would attract 1.7 million people for the original 41 shows, which is an average of 40,000 people per show. In February 2025, it was estimated that the tour will attract 2.2 million people worldwide for the total shows, the largest amount for a single concert tour by a South Korean artist.

With the Dominate World Tour, Stray Kids became the first South Korean act to perform in several venues: Estádio do Morumbi, São Paulo; T-Mobile Park, Seattle; Camping World Stadium, Orlando; Nationals Park, Washington, D.C.; Wrigley Field, Chicago; Globe Life Field, Arlington; Rogers Stadium, Toronto (also the first overall artist); Johan Cruijff Arena, Amsterdam; Deutsche Bank Park, Frankfurt; Tottenham Hotspur Stadium, London; Riyadh Air Metropolitano, Madrid; and Stadio Olimpico, Rome. The tour was also the largest concert by a solo South Korean artist and the first by an Asian act in the Netherlands, Germany, and Spain. According to Billboard, the tour was the biggest ever concert tour in Latin America, North America, and Europe, sold 1.3 million tickets and grossed $185.9 million in 2025, including two shows in Hong Kong. Pollstar ranked Stray Kids number two on the "Top 20 Global Concert Tours", the highest K-pop artist.

== Media ==
=== Stray Kids: The Dominate Experience ===
A concert film of the Dominate World Tour, titled Stray Kids: The Dominate Experience, was released on February 6, 2026, by Crosswalk in North America and Universal Pictures internationally. With a runtime of 145 minutes, it features the footage of the Dominate World Tour at SoFi Stadium, Inglewood. The film was directed by Paul Dugdale and produced by Live Nation Studios, while Farah X directed the documentary segments. Live Nation reported that the film's ticket sales in the United States sold $1.4 million on the first day of ticket selling. As of February 8, 2026, it has grossed $5.7 million at the North American box office and $20 million worldwide, and would rank first at the box office on its opening day.

=== Other media ===
A virtual concert, titled Lynkpop: Stray Kids World Tour <Dominate Japan> VR premiered from March 6 to June 21, 2026, at Seibu Shibuya in Tokyo. It was filmed at Shizuoka Stadium ECOPA.

== Setlist ==
Set list in Asia and Australia (August 24, 2024 – January 19, 2025)

Main set

1. "Mountains"
2. "Thunderous" (GDA version)
3. "Jjam"
4. "District 9"
5. "Back Door"
6. "Hold My Hand" (Han solo)
7. "Youth" (Lee Know solo)
8. "As We Are" (Seungmin solo)
9. "So Good" (Hyunjin solo)
10. "Chk Chk Boom"
11. "Topline"
12. "Super Bowl"
13. "Comflex"
14. "Lalalala"
15. "Twilight"
16. "Lonely St."
17. "Social Path" (Korean version)
18. "Railway" (Bang Chan solo)
19. "Hallucination" (I.N solo)
20. "Unfair" (Felix solo)
21. "Ultra" (Changbin solo)
22. "Get Lit"
23. "Item"
24. "Domino"
25. "God's Menu"
26. "S-Class" (VMA version)
27. "Venom" (MAMA version)
28. "Maniac" (MAMA version)

Encore

29. "I Like It"
30. "Case 143"
31. "My Pace"
32. "Stray Kids"
33. "Miroh"
34. "Chk Chk Boom" (Festival version)

Notes

- Starting in Seoul on August 25, 2024, Stray Kids additionally performed a song after "Chk Chk Boom" (Festival version):
  - "Haven": Seoul (day 2–4; the day 4 sang after "Star Lost"), Singapore, Melbourne, Kaohsiung, Tokyo (day 1), Macau (day 1), and Hong Kong (day 2)
  - "Star Lost": Seoul (day 4), Sydney, Tokyo (day 2), and Bangkok
  - "Fam": Tokyo (day 3) and Osaka (day 2)
  - "Megaverse": Bocaue, Macau (day 2), and Hong Kong (day 1)
  - "Circus": Osaka (day 1)
  - "Christmas Love": Osaka (day 3)
  - "Freeze": Jakarta
- At the Tokyo and Osaka shows, Stray Kids performed the Japanese versions of "Super Bowl", "Social Path", "Case 143", and "My Pace"; and added "Giant" between "Lalalala" and "Twilight".
- At the Bangkok show, Stray Kids debuted a part of "Walkin on Water" performance unofficially.
Set list in Latin America, Fukuroi, North America, and Europe (March 27 – July 31, 2025)

Main set

1. "Mountains"
2. "Thunderous" (GDA version)
3. "Jjam"
4. "District 9"
5. "Back Door"
6. Dancers' medley ("Hellevator", "Easy", "S-Class", "Walkin on Water", "Charmer", "Venom", "Hall of Fame")
7. "Chk Chk Boom"
8. "Domino"
9. "God's Menu"
10. "Truman" (Han and Felix)
11. "Burnin' Tires" (Changbin and I.N)
12. "Escape" (Bang Chan and Hyunjin)
13. "Cinema" (Lee Know and Seungmin)
14. "Giant" (Korean version)
15. "Walkin on Water"
16. "S-Class" (VMA version)
17. "Lonely St."
18. "I Am You"
19. "Cover Me"
20. "Topline"
21. "Social Path" (Korean version)
22. "Lalalala"
23. "Megaverse"
24. "Maniac" (MAMA version)

Encore

25. "I Like It"
26. "Blind Spot"
27. "Stray Kids"
28. "Miroh"
29. "Chk Chk Boom" (Festival version)

Notes

- Songs performed after "Chk Chk Boom" (Festival version):
  - "Haven": Santiago (day 1), São Paulo (day 1), Seattle, Cumberland, New York (day 2), Chicago, London (day 2), Paris (day 2), and Rome
  - "Get Lit": Santiago (day 2; before "Chk Chk Boom" (Festival version)), Arlington (day 1), and London (day 1)
  - "Ta": Rio de Janeiro
  - "My Pace": São Paulo (day 2; before "Chk Chk Boom" (Festival version))
  - "God's Menu": Lima (swapped from main set to encore due to issues with security after performing "Domino")
  - "Hall of Fame": Mexico City (day 1), Fukuroi (day 3), Inglewood (day 2), New York (day 1), and Amsterdam
  - "Star Lost": Mexico City (day 2), San Francisco, Orlando, Toronto, Madrid, and Rome
  - "Case 143" (Japanese version): Fukuroi (day 1)
  - "Circus": Fukuroi (day 2)
  - "Fam": Fukuroi (day 4)
  - "Item": Inglewood (day 1), and Frankfurt
  - "Freeze": Arlington (day 2), and Paris (day 1)
- At the Fukuroi shows, Stray Kids performed the Japanese version of "Giant" and "Social Path" and added "Hollow" between "S-Class" and "Lonely St."
- Starting at Fukuroi shows, "I Am You" was removed from the setlist and "Super Board" and "My Pace" were added surround "I Like It".
- At the Washington, D.C. show, Stray Kids did not perform encore due to heat wave causing attendees suffering heat-related illnesses.
Set list in Incheon (October 18–19, 2025)

Main set

1. "Mountains"
2. "Thunderous" (GDA version)
3. "Jjam"
4. "District 9"
5. "Back Door"
6. "Bleep"
7. "Domino"
8. "Chk Chk Boom"
9. "Truman" (Han and Felix)
10. "Burnin' Tires" (Changbin and I.N)
11. "Escape" (Bang Chan and Hyunjin)
12. "Cinema" (Lee Know and Seungmin)
13. "Walkin on Water"
14. "God's Menu"
15. "S-Class" (VMA version)
16. "Ceremony"
17. "Half Time"
18. "Lonely St."
19. "Cover Me"
20. "In My Head"
21. "Topline"
22. "Social Path" (Korean version)
23. "Lalalala" (Rock version)
24. "Megaverse"
25. "Maniac" (MAMA version)

Encore

25. "Super Board"
26. "I Like It"
27. "My Pace"
28. "Blind Spot"
29. "Stray Kids"
30. "Miroh"
31. "Chk Chk Boom" (Festival version)
32. "Ceremony" (Festival version)

Notes

- On the second day, "Star Lost" and "Haven" replaced "Ceremony" (Festival version).

== Tour dates ==
List of 2024 concerts, showing date, city, country, venue, and attendance
Date (2024)	City	Country	Venue	Attendance
August 24	Seoul	South Korea	KSPO Dome	—
August 25	Seoul	South Korea	KSPO Dome	—
August 31	Seoul	South Korea	KSPO Dome	—
September 1 (Note: Streamed simultaneously on Beyond Live.)	Seoul	South Korea	KSPO Dome	—
September 28	Singapore		National Stadium	30,000
October 19	Melbourne	Australia	Marvel Stadium	—
October 26	Sydney	Australia	Allianz Stadium	—
November 3 (Note: Postponed from November 2, 2024, due to Typhoon Kong-rey.)	Kaohsiung	Taiwan	Kaohsiung National Stadium	40,000
November 14	Tokyo	Japan	Tokyo Dome	165,000
November 16	Tokyo	Japan	Tokyo Dome	165,000
November 17 (Note: Streamed simultaneously on Abema, Stagecrowd, Hulu Japan, U-Next, and Lemino.)	Tokyo	Japan	Tokyo Dome	165,000
November 23	Bocaue (Note: Labelled as Manila or Bulacan in promotional material.)	Philippines	Philippine Arena	55,000
November 29	Macau	China	Galaxy Arena	—
November 30	Macau	China	Galaxy Arena	—
December 5	Osaka	Japan	Kyocera Dome	150,000
December 7	Osaka	Japan	Kyocera Dome	150,000
December 8	Osaka	Japan	Kyocera Dome	150,000
December 14	Bangkok	Thailand	Suphachalasai Stadium	20,000
December 21	Jakarta	Indonesia	Indonesia Arena (Note: Upgraded from Madya Stadium.)	—

List of 2025 concerts, showing date, city, country, venue, attendance, and revenue
Date (2025)	City	Country	Venue	Attendance	Revenue
January 18	Hong Kong	China	AsiaWorld–Arena	—	—
January 19	Hong Kong	China	AsiaWorld–Arena	—	—
March 27	Santiago	Chile	Estadio Bicentenario de La Florida	65,000	$41,100,000
March 28	Santiago	Chile	Estadio Bicentenario de La Florida	65,000	$41,100,000
April 1	Rio de Janeiro	Brazil	Estádio Nilton Santos	55,000	$41,100,000
April 5	São Paulo	Brazil	Estádio MorumBIS	120,000	$41,100,000
April 6	São Paulo	Brazil	Estádio MorumBIS	120,000	$41,100,000
April 9	Lima	Peru	Estadio San Marcos	45,000	$41,100,000
April 12	Mexico City	Mexico	Estadio GNP Seguros	115,000	$41,100,000
April 13	Mexico City	Mexico	Estadio GNP Seguros	115,000	$41,100,000
May 10	Fukuroi (Note: Labelled as Shizuoka in promotional material.)	Japan	Shizuoka Stadium ECOPA	220,000	—
May 11	Fukuroi	Japan	Shizuoka Stadium ECOPA	220,000	—
May 17 (Note: Streamed simultaneously on Abema, Stagecrowd, Hulu Japan, and U-Next.)	Fukuroi	Japan	Shizuoka Stadium ECOPA	220,000	—
May 18	Fukuroi	Japan	Shizuoka Stadium ECOPA	220,000	—
May 24	Seattle	United States	T-Mobile Park	491,000	$76,200,000
May 28	San Francisco	United States	Oracle Park	491,000	$76,200,000
May 31	Inglewood (Note: Labelled as Los Angeles in promotional material.)	United States	SoFi Stadium	491,000	$76,200,000
June 1	Inglewood	United States	SoFi Stadium	491,000	$76,200,000
June 6	Arlington	United States	Globe Life Field	491,000	$76,200,000
June 7	Arlington	United States	Globe Life Field	491,000	$76,200,000
June 10	Cumberland (Note: Labelled as Atlanta in promotional material.)	United States	Truist Park	491,000	$76,200,000
June 14	Orlando	United States	Camping World Stadium	491,000	$76,200,000
June 18	New York City	United States	Citi Field	491,000	$76,200,000
June 19	New York City	United States	Citi Field	491,000	$76,200,000
June 23	Washington, D.C.	United States	Nationals Park	491,000	$76,200,000
June 26	Chicago	United States	Wrigley Field	491,000	$76,200,000
June 29	Toronto	Canada	Rogers Stadium	491,000	$76,200,000
July 11	Amsterdam	Netherlands	Johan Cruijff Arena	50,000	$64,500,000
July 15	Frankfurt	Germany	Deutsche Bank Park	45,000	$64,500,000
July 18	London	England	Tottenham Hotspur Stadium	90,000	$64,500,000
July 19	London	England	Tottenham Hotspur Stadium	90,000	$64,500,000
July 22	Madrid	Spain	Riyadh Air Metropolitano	60,000	$64,500,000
July 26	Saint-Denis (Note: Labelled as Paris in promotional material.)	France	Stade de France	120,000	$64,500,000
July 27	Saint-Denis	France	Stade de France	120,000	$64,500,000
July 30	Rome	Italy	Stadio Olimpico	70,000	$64,500,000
October 18 (Note: Billed as Dominate: Celebrate)	Incheon	South Korea	Incheon Asiad Main Stadium	60,000	—
October 19	Incheon	South Korea	Incheon Asiad Main Stadium	60,000	—
Total				1,300,000 (31/56) shows (2025)	US$185,700,000 (2025)

=== Cancelled shows ===
List of cancelled concerts, showing date, city, country, and reason
Date (2025)	City	Country	Venue	Reason
July 23	Madrid	Spain	Riyadh Air Metropolitano	Unforeseen circumstances

== Personnel ==
Stray Kids

- Bang Chan
- Lee Know
- Changbin
- Hyunjin
- Han
- Felix
- Seungmin
- I.N

Band

- Garrett Jones – guitar
- Jamal Moore – drum
- Jon Reshard – bass
- Yung Wurld – keyboard
