= Just Breathe =

Just Breathe may refer to:

- "Just Breathe" (Pearl Jam song)
- "Just Breathe" (Sky-Hi song)
- Just Breathe, a 2005 album by LoveHateHero
- Just Breathe, a 2025 crime drama/thriller film starring Kyle Gallner

== See also ==
- "Just Breath" [sic], a song from Restore (EP) by Jinjin & Rocky
