= Hollow (Stray Kids EP) =

- Standard cover

EP by Stray Kids
- Released: June 18, 2025
- Studio: JYPE (Seoul); Channie's "Room" (Seoul)
- Length: 16:40
- Language: Japanese; English
- Label: Epic Japan
- Producer: 3Racha; Millionboy; Versachoi; Nickko Young

Stray Kids chronology
Mixtape: Dominate (2025)	Hollow (2025)	Karma (2025)

Singles from Hollow
- 1. "Hollow" Released: June 11, 2025

Hollow is the fourth Japanese-language extended play (Note: Hollow is marketed as the "third mini-album", which does not count the "first EP" Social Path / Super Bowl (Japanese Ver.).) (fifteenth overall) by South Korean boy band Stray Kids. It was released by Epic Records Japan on June 18, 2025, seven months after its predecessor Giant (2024). The EP was supported by the lead single of the same name. Commercially, Hollow topped the Oricon Albums Chart and Billboard Japan Hot Albums, and was certified triple platinum by Recording Industry Association of Japan (RIAJ). The album won the Album of the Year (Asia) at the 40th Japan Gold Disc Award.

== Background and release ==
On April 14, 2025, Stray Kids announced the fourth extended play, titled Hollow, to be released on June 18, preceded by multiple teaser images. The EP came in 12 physical editions: first press limited A and B, limited production, standard, and 8 fanclub editions with cover featured each member. The EP's each edition's cover artwork and track list were revealed on April 25, consisting of five original Japanese tracks, including the lead single of the same name, "Hollow".

== Promotion ==
On January 30, 2025, Stray Kids announced the additional four-date Fukuroi shows of the Dominate World Tour, taking place at Shizuoka Stadium on May 10, 11, 17, and 18. At the shows, the group debuted the performance of Hollow's title track "Hollow", before it was released as a single ahead the EP on June 11, alongside its music video. To promote the EP, Stray Kids perform the title track on Buzz Rhythm 02 on June 13, along with "Walkin on Water", and The Weekly 99 Music on June 18. The group also gave an interview to morning show Mezamashi TV on June 17. The band also appeared on The First Take to sing "Chk Chk Boom" (Japanese version) and "Hollow". Additionally, the EP's track "Parade" is used as a theme for Japanese horror film Karada Sagashi: The Last Night (2025), which first teased on the special video revealing new five cast members.

== Accolades ==
List of awards and nominations received by Hollow
Ceremony	Year	Category	Result	Ref.
Japan Gold Disc Award	2026	Album of the Year (Asia)	Won	
Japan Gold Disc Award	2026	Best 3 Albums (Asia)	Won	

== Commercial performance ==
Hollow debuted at number one on the Oricon Albums Chart, dated June 30, 2025, with 523,063 copies in its first week from June 16 to 22, 2025. The EP broke the single-week best-selling album record by the group previously held by 506,000 copies of Social Path / Super Bowl (Japanese Ver.) (2023), and by non-Japanese artist in 2025, surpassing 457,000 copies of Seventeen's Happy Burstday (2025). It also became the third 2025 album to exceed 500,000 copies sold in its first week after Snow Man's The Best 2020–2025 and Timelesz's Fam, and the first by a non-Japanese artist. The EP also landed at number one on the Digital Albums Chart, earning 3,784 units, the band's second album to top the chart since 5-Star (2023). Eventually, Hollow peaked at number one on the Combined Albums Chart.

SoundScan Japan reported that Hollow sold 619,245 physical copies during flying get, on June 17, 2025. According to GfK/NIQ Japan, the EP earned 3,135 downloads on its release date. The EP debuted atop the Billboard Japan Hot Albums for the issue dated June 25, 2025. The EP also topped both the Top Albums Sales with 738,209 physical copies, becoming the second biggest physical sales week in 2025, behind Snow Man's The Best 2020–2025; and Download Albums with 3,761 digital sales, making it the group's second album to top the chart since 5-Star (2023), and the biggest digital sales week, surpassing 3,395 sales of Ate (2024). Recording Industry Association of Japan certified Hollow triple platinum for 750,000 shipments on July 10, 2025.

== Track listing ==
Hollow track listing
No.	Title	Lyrics	Music	Arrangement	Length
1.	"Hollow"	Bang Chan (3Racha); Changbin (3Racha); Han (3Racha); KM-Markit	Bang Chan; Changbin; Han; Versachoi	Versachoi	3:29
2.	"Parade"	Bang Chan; Changbin; Han; KM-Markit	Bang Chan; Changbin; Han; Millionboy	Millionboy; Bang Chan	3:06
3.	"Never Alone"	Bang Chan; Changbin; Han; Yohei	Bang Chan; Changbin; Han; Versachoi	Versachoi; Bang Chan	2:57
4.	"Just a Little"	Han; KM-Markit	Han; Bang Chan	Bang Chan; Millionboy	4:06
5.	"Fate" (宿命)	Changbin; Restart; KM-Markit	Changbin; Restart; Millionboy; Nickko Young	Millionboy; Nickko Young	3:00
Total length:					16:40

Hollow – FC limited bonus track
No.	Title	Music	Arrangement	Length
6.	"Hollow" (instrumental)	Bang Chan; Changbin; Han; Versachoi	Versachoi	3:26
Total length:				20:06

Hollow — Limited A bonus track (Blu-ray)
No.	Title	Director(s)	Length
1.	"Jacket shooting making movie"
2.	"Jacket shooting making movie" (relay cam version)
3.	"Hollow" (recording making movie)
4.	"Giant" (music video)	Novvkim	2:58
5.	"Giant" (music video making)
6.	"Christmas Love" (music video)		3:07
7.	"Christmas Love" (music video making movie)
Total length:			90:40

== Credits and personnel ==
Musicians

- Stray Kids – lead vocals (all), background vocals (2–3, 5)
  - Bang Chan (3Racha) – background vocals (1), vocal direction (1–4), instruments (3–4), computer programming (2–4)
  - Changbin (3Racha) – background vocals (2), vocal direction (1–3, 5)
  - Han (3Racha) – background vocals (1, 4), vocal direction (1–4)
  - Felix – background vocals (1)
- Versachoi – instruments (1, 3), computer programming (1, 3), vocal direction (3)
- Millionboy – instruments (2), synthesizer (5), drums (5), bass guitar (5), computer programming (2, 5), vocal direction (2, 4–5)
- Nickko Young – guitar (5)
- Restart – background vocals (5), vocal direction (5)

Technical

- Goo Hye-jin – recording (1), vocal editing (3)
- Bang Chan (3Racha) – recording (1–4), vocal editing (1–4)
- Eom Se-hee – recording (2–4), vocal editing (3)
- Seo Eun-il – recording (2–3)
- Lee Chang-hun – recording (5)
- Jang Woo-young – vocal editing (1–2)
- Lee Kyeong-won – vocal editing (4)
- Restart – vocal editing (5)
- Alawn – mixing (1–2)
- Yoon Won-kwon – mixing (3–5)
- Dale Baker – mastering (1)
  - Noah McCorkle – assistant (1)
- Kwon Nam-woo – mastering (2–5)

Locations

- JYPE Studios – recording (1–3, 5)
- Channie's "Room" – recording (1–4)
- Alawn Music Studios – mixing (1–2)
- MadMiix – mixing (3–5)
- Baker Mastering – mastering (1)
- 821 Sound Mastering – mastering (2–5)

== Charts ==
=== Weekly charts ===
Weekly chart performance for Hollow
Chart (2025)	Peak position
Hungarian Physical Albums (MAHASZ)	7
Japanese Albums (Oricon)	1
Japanese Combined Albums (Oricon)	1
Japanese Hot Albums (Billboard Japan)	1
US World Albums (Billboard)	18

=== Monthly charts ===
Monthly chart performance for Hollow
Chart (2025)	Position
Japanese Albums (Oricon)	2

=== Year-end charts ===
2025 year-end chart performance for Hollow
Chart (2025)	Position
Japanese Albums (Oricon)	5
Japanese Combined Albums (Oricon)	5
Japanese Hot Albums (Billboard Japan)	70

== Certifications ==
Certifications for Hollow
Region	Certification	Certified units/sales
Japan (RIAJ) Physical	3× Platinum	750,000^{^}
^{^} Shipments figures based on certification alone.

== Release history ==
Release dates and formats for Hollow
Region	Date	Format	Version	Label	Ref.
Japan	June 10, 2025	CD + Blu-ray	Limited A	Epic Japan	
Japan	June 10, 2025	CD	Limited B; standard; FC limited	Epic Japan	
Various	June 10, 2025	Digital download; streaming	Standard	Epic Japan	
South Korea	June 10, 2025	Digital download; streaming	Standard	JYP	

== See also ==
- List of Billboard Japan Hot Albums number ones of 2025
- List of Oricon number-one albums of 2025
