= Lose My Breath (Stray Kids song) =

2024 single by Stray Kids featuring Charlie Puth

Single by Stray Kids featuring Charlie Puth
- Written: September 2023
- Released: May 10, 2024
- Studio: JYPE (Seoul)
- Genre: Pop; R&B
- Length: 2:46
- Label: JYP; Republic
- Composers: Charlie Puth; Bang Chan; Changbin; Han; Johnny Goldstein
- Lyricists: Charlie Puth; Jacob Kasher Hindlin; Natalie Salomon; Bang Chan; Changbin; Han
- Producers: Charlie Puth; Johnny Goldstein

Stray Kids singles chronology
"Lalalala" (2023)	"Lose My Breath" (2024)	"Chk Chk Boom" (2024)

Charlie Puth singles chronology
"Lipstick" (2023)	"Lose My Breath" (2024)	"Hero" (2024)

Music video
- "Lose My Breath" on YouTube

"Lose My Breath" is a song by South Korean boy band Stray Kids, featuring American singer-songwriter Charlie Puth. It was released as their first official English-language single through JYP Entertainment and Republic Records on May 10, 2024. A pop and R&B track, the song was written by Puth, 3Racha, Jacob Kasher Hindlin, Natalie Salomon, and Johnny Goldstein with production from Puth and Goldstein, and talks about the feeling of meeting a love interest for the first time, which is compared to the inability to breathe. Commercially, "Lose My Breath" peaked at number 90 on the Billboard Hot 100, and number 97 on the UK Singles Chart.

== Background and release ==
Stray Kids' in-house production team 3Racha and Charlie Puth held a song camp for working on "Lose My Breath" in September 2023 during 3Racha's attendance at the Global Citizen Festival in New York City, United States. They both first publicly interacted the next month when Puth was in Seoul, South Korea for the three-day Charlie Live Experience. He posted Instagram Stories to thank Stray Kids for sending a meal. The group then responded to his story, "Good luck with your show Charlie! Wanna join ours...? Hahaha."

On April 17, 2024, Stray Kids announced "Lose My Breath", featuring Puth, which was released on May 10, 2024. JYP Entertainment stated that the song was intended to "ignite anticipation" for a forthcoming Korean release in mid-2024. Digital pre-saves and CD single pre-orders for US customers became available the next day. The individual and group teaser images express their "suffocating and confused feelings" and "being unable to control oneself" because of "unfamiliar feelings of love" with "sad eyes in a dark space". Two snippets of "Lose My Breath" were also teased on April 26 and 30. The group introduced the song via the video "Intro: Lose My Breath", uploaded on May 9. The remix versions were released on May 13, consisting of Stray Kids' version, a version with added rap lyrics, and a soft garage version.

== Lyrics and composition ==
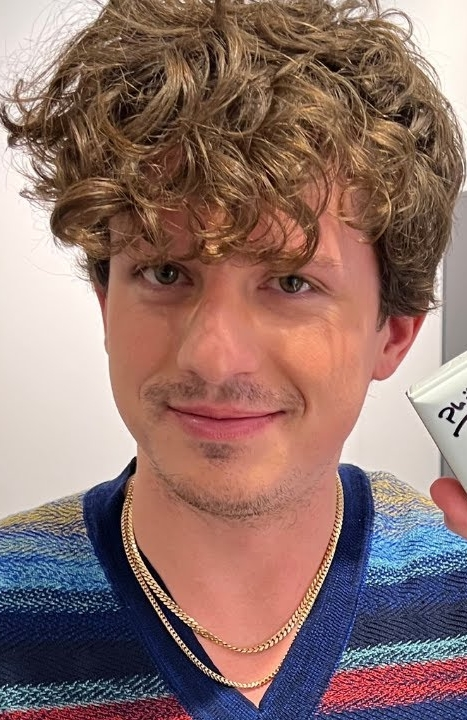
Charlie Puth (pictured) features on and co-wrote "Lose My Breath".

"Lose My Breath" was written by Puth, 3Racha (consisting of Bang Chan, Changbin, Han), Jacob Kasher Hindlin, Natalie Salomon, and Johnny Goldstein; Puth and Goldstein handled the production. Musically, it is a pop track with "an old-school feel but also a strong R&B vibe", and includes guitar arpeggios, which give "1990s boyband sensibilities". Lyrically, the song expresses the "strong" feelings of meeting a love interest for the first time, which causes the protagonist to feel like they cannot breathe and their heart stops beating.

== Music video ==
An accompanying music video for "Lose My Breath" premiered on May 10, 2024, in conjunction with the single release, preceded by two teaser videos. It was directed by Soze, and depicts Stray Kids doing different routines and chasing an unknown force as meteor-like fireworks explode in the sky, reflecting loving and longing for someone with a mermaid theme. Puth did not appear on the video. The choreography scenes include dancing in several inches of water and in the pouring rain.

== Live performances ==
Stray Kids first performed "Lose My Breath" on Good Morning America on May 15, 2024, and later on The Kelly Clarkson Show on May 22.

== Track listing ==
- CD single / digital download / streaming
1. "Lose My Breath" (featuring Charlie Puth) – 2:46
2. "Lose My Breath" (instrumental) – 2:46
- Digital download / streaming – Remixes
1. "Lose My Breath" (Stray Kids version) – 2:46
2. "Lose My Breath" (featuring Charlie Puth; soft garage version) – 3:17

== Credits and personnel ==
Personnel

- Stray Kids – lead vocals
  - Bang Chan (3Racha) – background vocals, lyrics, composition, arrangement, vocal direction
  - Changbin (3Racha) – lyrics, composition
  - Han (3Racha) – lyrics, composition
- Charlie Puth – featured vocals, background vocals, lyrics, composition, arrangement, production, vocal direction, all instruments
- Jacob Kasher Hindlin – lyrics
- Natalie Salomon – lyrics
- Johnny Goldstein – composition, arrangement, production, vocal direction, all instruments, keyboard, drums, digital editing, recording
- Lee Kyeong-won – digital editing
- Goo Hye-jin – recording
- Seo Eun-il – recording
- Manny Marroquin – mixing
- Chris Galland – mix engineering
  - Ramiro Fernandez-Seoane – assistant
- Zach Pereyra – mastering

Locations

- JYPE Studios – recording
- Larrabee Studios – mixing, mastering

== Charts ==
=== Weekly charts ===
Weekly chart performance for "Lose My Breath"
Chart (2024)	Peak position
Australia Digital Tracks (ARIA)	44
Australia Hitseekers (ARIA)	7
Canada Digital Song Sales (Billboard)	24
Global 200 (Billboard)	35
Japan Hot 100 (Billboard)	27
Japan Combined Singles (Oricon)	23
Netherlands (Global Top 40)	32
New Zealand Hot Singles (RMNZ)	13
Singapore Regional (RIAS)	12
South Korea BGM (Circle)	78
South Korea Download (Circle)	52
Taiwan (Billboard)	14
UK Singles (OCC)	97
US Billboard Hot 100	90

=== Monthly charts ===
Monthly chart performance for "Lose My Breath"
Chart (2024)	Position
South Korea Download (Circle)	97

== Release history ==
Release dates and formats for "Lose My Breath"
Region	Date	Format	Version	Label	Ref.
United States	May 10, 2024	CD single	Original	JYP; Republic	
Various	May 10, 2024	Digital download; streaming	Original	JYP; Republic	
Various	May 12, 2024	Digital download	Stray Kids; soft garage	JYP; Republic	
Various	May 13, 2024	Digital download; streaming	Remixes	JYP; Republic	
United States	May 14, 2024	Contemporary hit radio	Original	JYP; Republic	
