= Hollow (Stray Kids song) =

Single by Stray Kids

from the EP Hollow
- Language: Japanese; English
- Released: June 11, 2025
- Studio: JYPE (Seoul); Channie's "Room" (Seoul)
- Genre: Pop
- Length: 3:29
- Label: Epic Japan
- Composers: Bang Chan; Changbin; Han; Versachoi
- Lyricists: Bang Chan; Changbin; Han; KM-Markit

Stray Kids singles chronology
"Walkin on Water" (2024)	"Hollow" (2025)	"Ceremony" (2025)

Music video
- "Hollow" on YouTube

"Hollow" is a song by South Korean boy band Stray Kids from their fourth Japanese-language extended play of the same name. It was released as the EP's lead single by Epic Records Japan on June 11, 2025, alongside its music video.

== Background and release ==
Stray Kids announced their fourth Japanese-language extended play (EP) (Note: Hollow is marketed as the "third mini-album", which does not count the "first EP" Social Path / Super Bowl (Japanese Ver.).) Hollow on April 14, 2025, to be released the next two months, on June 18. The EP's track list were unveiled on April 25, including the lead single of the same name "Hollow". The song is available on digital music and streaming platforms on June 11, a week before the EP release.

== Composition ==
The song's title "Hollow" contains double entendre in both English and Korean hollo (홀로), which the latter means "lonely". A pop track with strong synthesizer, electric guitar, and emotional piano, the song lyrically expresses the feeling of sudden emptiness in a day. It also applied to the band wanting to fulfilled their fans called Stay's loneliness.

== Music video ==
An accompanying music video for "Hollow" premiered on June 11, 2025, in conjunction with the single. Directed by Novvkim and filming in Seoul, South Korea for two days, the music video depicts Stray Kids as Pinocchio attached to strings and being controlled by external forces becoming a real human, as well as emotional choreography.

== Live performances ==
Stray Kids debuted "Hollow" and its live performance on May 10, 2025 at the Dominate World Tour, taking place at Shizuoka Stadium, Fukuroi. Later, the group perform the song on Buzz Rhythm 02 on June 13, alongside "Walkin on Water", The Weekly 99 Music on June 18, and The First Take on July 2.

== Credits and personnel ==
Personnel

- Stray Kids – vocals
  - Bang Chan (3Racha) – background vocals, lyrics, composition, vocal direction, vocal editing, recording
  - Changbin (3Racha) – lyrics, composition, vocal direction
  - Han (3Racha) – background vocals, lyrics, composition, vocal direction
  - Felix – background vocals
- KM-Markit – Japanese lyrics
- Versachoi – composition, arrangement, instruments, computer programming
- Goo Hye-jin – recording
- Jang Woo-young – vocal editing
- Alawn – mixing
- Dale Baker – mastering
  - Noah McCorkle – assistant

Locations

- JYPE Studios – recording
- Channie's "Room" – recording
- Alawn Music Studio – mixing
- Baker Mastering – mastering

== Charts ==
Chart performance for "Hollow"
Chart (2025)	Peak position
Japan Hot 100 (Billboard)	30
Japan Combined Singles (Oricon)	38
New Zealand Hot Singles (RMNZ)	37
South Korea Download (Circle)	192
UK Singles Sales (OCC)	30
US World Digital Song Sales (Billboard)	7

== Release history ==
Release dates and formats for "Hollow"
Region	Date	Format	Label	Ref.
Various	June 11, 2025	Digital download; streaming	Epic Japan	
South Korea	June 11, 2025	Digital download; streaming	JYP	
