= Walkin on Water =

- Remixes cover

Single by Stray Kids

from the album Hop
- Language: Korean; English
- Released: December 13, 2024
- Studio: JYPE (Seoul); Channie's "Room" (Seoul)
- Genre: Old-school hip-hop
- Length: 2:28
- Label: JYP; Republic
- Composers: Bang Chan; Changbin; Han; Restart; Chae Gang-hae
- Lyricists: Bang Chan; Changbin; Han

Stray Kids singles chronology
| "Giant" (2024) | "Walkin on Water" (2024) | "Hollow" (2025) |

Music video
- "Walkin on Water" on YouTube

"Walkin on Water" is a song by South Korean boy band Stray Kids from their first mixtape Hop (2024). It was released as the mixtape's lead single by JYP Entertainment and Republic Records on December 13, 2024.

== Background and release ==
On November 15, 2024, Stray Kids announced their first mixtape Hop, marketed as "SKZhop Hiptape". Four days later, the group revealed the mixtape's track list, which confirmed that "Walkin on Water" would be the lead single, and included the "Hip" version of the song. "Walkin on Water" was first previewed via a mashup video alongside "Bounce Back" and "U" on December 7, and teased choreography by each member via short-form video platforms on December 11–12. The song was released alongside the mixtape on December 13 and its remix EP—Sleigh, Sway, sped up, and instrumental versions—the next three days.

== Composition ==
"Walkin on Water" was written by Stray Kids' in-house production team 3Racha, and co-composed with Restart and Chae Gang-hae. Described as a "challenge", 3Racha revealed on behind-the-scenes video Intro "Hop" that it is the first time that the song contains only one genre in the whole song, which is "old-school hip-hop genre with boom bap beats", departing from mixing diverse sounds of previous works, such as "Chk Chk Boom". It includes rhythmic chant of "water water walkin on ppikkippikki", but "water" was pronounced "wuh-huh", as well as water splashing sound effects. Lyrically, the song compared walking on the flowing water as Stray Kids' confidence toward the stage and overcoming obstacles, likening the group's "autobiography" throughout seven years.

== Music video ==
An accompanying music video for "Walkin on Water" premiered on December 13, 2024, in conjunction with the song and Hop releases, preceded by two teaser videos. It shows a mixing and matching of traditional Korean and hip-hop cultures, which was compared to the group's music video for 2021 single "Thunderous". The music video begins with a group of unknown people readying bows and arrows and depicts Stray Kids, wearing trendy outfits, doing activities at traditional Korean palace: driving and lining up motorcycles and horses and standing on the boat in front of the palace, driving water scooter on the pond inside the palace, and playing billiard and janggi in the pavilion.

== Live performances ==
Stray Kids unofficially performed a part of "Walkin on Water" at the Bangkok show of Dominate World Tour on December 14, 2024, before it was officially added on the tour's setlist starting in Santiago on March 27, 2025. The group debuted the full performance of the song at the 2024 Music Bank Global Festival in Japan at Mizuho PayPay Dome Fukuoka on December 15, 2025. They also performed the song alongside "Mountains" at the 2024 SBS Gayo Daejeon on December 25, and "Chk Chk Boom" at the 2024 MBC Gayo Daejejeon on January 30, 2025. They performed "Walkin on Water" and "Hollow" at Japanese music program Buzz Rhythm 02 on June 13, 2025.

== Accolades ==
Music program awards for "Walkin on Water"
| Program | Date | Ref. |
|---|---|---|
| M Countdown | January 9, 2025 | |
| Music Bank | December 20, 2024 | |
| Music Bank | December 27, 2024 | |

== Track listing ==
- Digital download and streaming – Remixes
1. "Walkin on Water" (Sleigh version) – 2:35
2. "Walkin on Water" (Sway version) – 2:24
3. "Walkin on Water" (sped up version) – 2:09
4. "Walkin on Water" (instrumental) – 2:28

== Credits and personnel ==
Musicians

- Stray Kids – lead vocals
  - Bang Chan (3Racha) – background vocals, lyrics, composition, arrangement, instruments, computer programming, digital editing, recording
  - Changbin (3Racha) – background vocals, lyrics, composition
  - Han (3Racha) – background vocals, lyrics, composition
  - Felix – background vocals
- Restart – composition, arrangement, instruments, computer programming
- Chae Gang-hae – composition, arrangement, instruments, computer programming
- Lee Kyeong-won – digital editing
- Lee Chang-hoon – recording
- Goo Hye-jin – recording
- Manny Marroquin – mixing, mixing in Dolby Atmos
- Chris Galland – mix engineering
  - Ramiro Fernandez-Seoane – assistant
- Dale Becker – mastering
  - Noah McCorkle – assistant
  - Katie Harvey – assistant
  - Adam Burt – assistant

Locations

- JYPE Studios – recording
- Channie's "Room" – recording
- Larrabee Studios – mixing, mixing in Dolby Atmos
- Becker Mastering – mastering

== Charts ==
=== Weekly charts ===
Weekly chart performance
| Chart (2024) | Peak position |
|---|---|
| Global 200 (Billboard) | 66 |
| Japan Hot 100 (Billboard) | 83 |
| Japan Digital Singles (Oricon) | 42 |
| New Zealand Hot Singles (RMNZ) | 11 |
| Singapore Regional (RIAS) | 11 |
| South Korea (Circle) | 137 |
| UK Singles Sales (OCC) | 7 |
| US Bubbling Under Hot 100 (Billboard) | 8 |
| US Digital Song Sales (Billboard) | 5 |
| US World Digital Song Sales (Billboard) | 1 |

=== Monthly charts ===
Monthly chart performance
| Chart (2024) | Position |
|---|---|
| South Korea Download (Circle) | 6 |

=== Year-end charts ===
Year-end chart performance
| Chart (2024) | Position |
|---|---|
| South Korea Download (Circle) | 188 |

== Release history ==
Release dates and formats
| Region | Date | Format | Version | Label | Ref. |
|---|---|---|---|---|---|
| Various | December 13, 2024 | Digital download; streaming | Original; Hip | JYP; Republic | |
| Various | December 15, 2024 | Digital download | Sleigh; Sway; sped up; instrumental | JYP; Republic | |
| Various | December 16, 2024 | Digital download; streaming | Remixes | JYP; Republic | |

== See also ==
- List of M Countdown Chart winners (2024)
- List of Music Bank Chart winners (2024)
