= Mixtape: Dominate =

Single album by Stray Kids
- Released: March 21, 2025
- Studio: JYPE (Seoul); Channie's "Room" (Seoul); Bake Sound (Seoul)
- Length: 15:54
- Language: Korean; English
- Label: JYP; Republic
- Producer: 3Racha; Chae Gang-hae; Cona; Helixx; Hong Ji-sang; Lee Ki-hwan; Restart; Versachoi

Stray Kids chronology
Hop (2024)	Mixtape: Dominate (2025)	Hollow (2025)

Singles from Mixtape: Dominate
- 1. "Giant (Korean version)" Released: March 21, 2025

Mixtape: Dominate (stylized as Mixtape : dominATE) is a single album (Note: JYP Entertainment officially classified Mixtape: Dominate as a digital single, while streaming platforms labelled it as an EP.) by South Korean boy band Stray Kids. It was released through JYP Entertainment and Republic Records on March 21, 2025, as the fifth installment of "Mixtape Project" to commemorate the group's seventh anniversary.

== Background and promotion ==
On March 10, 2025, Stray Kids announced Mixtape: Dominate, as the fifth installment of "Mixtape Project" series after "Mixtape: Gone Days" (2019), "Mixtape: On Track" (2020), "Mixtape: Oh" (2021), and "Mixtape: Time Out" (2022). It was scheduled to be available on March 21 on digital music and streaming platforms to commemorate the group's seventh anniversary.

On March 12, its cover artwork and track list were revealed. The artwork conveys "a mysterious yet intense energy with a mix of various colors" and logos of each track. The single album consists of five tracks: the Korean version of "Giant" from Stray Kids' Japanese second studio album of the same name, and four sub-unit tracks, consisting of Changbin and I.N's "Burnin' Tires", Han and Felix's "Truman", Bang Chan and Hyunjin's "Escape", and Lee Know and Seungmin's "Cinema".

The group revealed promotional scheduler for Mixtape: Dominate on March 14, and teased all sub-unit tracks via the series "Unveil: Track", and their behind-the-scenes prior to the release. The music videos for the sub-unit tracks later uploaded between March 22 and 26, except 25. Stray Kids performed the sub-unit songs at the Dominate World Tour, starting at the Latin America leg of the tour in March 2025.

== Music and lyrics ==
Mixtape: Dominate consists of five tracks with 15 minutes and 54 seconds. The single album opens with the Korean version of "Giant", a mixing of boom bap and dubstep, expressing "working hard and refusing to take anything for granted, no matter how famous you get." Changbin and I.N's "Burnin' Tires" is a blend of rock and hip-hop, speaking about rebellion and freedom by "run[ning] our own path freely". Next, Han and Felix's "Truman" conveys a message of self-challenge and confident movement towards success.

It is followed by Bang Chan and Hyunjin's "Escape", an alternative R&B track driven by "dreamy" electric guitar and "captivating" reggae rhythm. Lyrically, the song reflects leaving behind the despair and escaping together to find love and freedom. It concludes with Lee Know and Seungmin's "Cinema", revolving around themes of perseverance, following dreams, and cherishing memories with loved ones as they will sing their best until the moment the curtain falls. Billboard named "Cinema" the 23rd best K-pop song in 2025.

== Track listing ==
Mixtape: Dominate track listing
No.	Title	Lyrics	Music	Arrangement	Length
1.	"Giant" (Korean version)	Bang Chan (3Racha); Changbin (3Racha); Han (3Racha)	Bang Chan; Changbin; Han; Restart; Chae Gang-hae	Restart; Chae; Bang Chan	2:53
2.	"Burnin' Tires" (Changbin and I.N)	Changbin; I.N	Changbin; I.N; Restart; Chae	Restart; Chae	2:53
3.	"Truman" (Han and Felix)	Han; Felix	Helixx (Vendors); Peach.L; Han; Felix	Helixx	3:15
4.	"Escape" (Bang Chan and Hyunjin)	Bang Chan; Hyunjin	Bang Chan; Hyunjin; Versachoi	Bang Chan; Versachoi	3:11
5.	"Cinema" (Lee Know and Seungmin)	Lee Know; Seungmin	Seungmin; Lee Ki-hwan; Cona	Lee; Cona	3:41
Total length:					15:54

== Credits and personnel ==
Musicians

- Stray Kids – lead vocals (1), background vocals (1)
  - Bang Chan (3Racha) – lead vocals (4), background vocals (4), instruments (1, 4), computer programming (1, 4), vocal direction (1)
  - Lee Know – lead vocals (5)
  - Changbin (3Racha) – lead vocals (2), background vocals (2), vocal direction (1–2)
  - Hyunjin – lead vocals (4), background vocals (4)
  - Han (3Racha) – lead vocals (3), background vocals (3), vocal direction (1)
  - Felix – lead vocals (3), background vocals (3)
  - Seungmin – lead vocals (5)
  - I.N – lead vocals (2), background vocals (2)
- Restart – instruments (1–2), computer programming (1)
- Chae Gang-hae – instruments (1–2), computer programming (1)
- Helixx (Vendors) – synthesizer (3), drums (3), bass (3), computer programming (3)
- Lim Young-woo – piano (3)
- Ham Seong-hun – guitar (3)
- Versachoi – instruments (4), computer programming (4)
- Nickko Young – guitar (4)
- Lee Ki-hwan – synthesizer (5), drums (5), MIDI programming (5)
- Cona – synthesizer (5), drums (5), MIDI programming (5)
- Jun Min-kyu – bass (5)
- Moonssi – guitar (5)

Technical

- Bang Chan (3Racha) – recording (1, 4), digital editing (1)
- Choi Hye-jin – recording (1)
- Goo Hye-jin – recording (1)
- Restart – recording (2)
- Changbin (3Racha) – recording (2)
- Han (3Racha) – recording (3)
- Seo Eun-il – recording (3)
- Na Su-min – recording (5)
- Lee Kyeong-won – digital editing (1–2)
- A.Zero – digital editing (3, 5), mixing (3, 5)
- Jang Woo-young – digital editing (4)
- Yoon Won-kwon – mixing (1–2, 4)
- Kwon Nam-woo – mastering (all)
- Gu Jong-pil – Dolby Atmos mixing (all)

Locations

- JYPE Studios – recording (1, 3)
- Channie's "Room" – recording (1, 4)
- Bake Sound – recording (5)
- Millennium Mix Lab – digital editing (3, 5), mixing (3, 5)
- MadMiix – mixing (1–2, 4)
- 821 Sound Mastering – mastering (all)
- KLANG Studio – Dolby Atmos mixing (all)

== Charts ==
=== Weekly charts ===
Weekly chart performance for Mixtape: Dominate
Chart (2025)	Peak position
Belgian Albums (Ultratop Flanders)	191
French Albums (SNEP)	191
Japanese Combined Albums (Oricon)	26
Japanese Hot Albums (Billboard Japan)	59
Portuguese Albums (AFP)	71
Swiss Albums (Schweizer Hitparade)	82

=== Year-end charts ===
Year-end chart performance for Mixtape: Dominate
Chart (2025)	Position
Japanese Download Albums (Billboard Japan)	37

== Release history ==
Release dates and formats for Mixtape: Dominate
Region	Date	Format	Label	Ref.
Various	March 21, 2025	Digital download; streaming	JYP; Republic	
