= Hop (mixtape) =

- Digital cover

Mixtape by Stray Kids
- Released: December 13, 2024
- Studios: JYPE (Seoul); Channie's "Room" (Seoul); Jisang's Studio (Seoul)
- Length: 34:05
- Languages: Korean; English
- Labels: JYP; Republic
- Producers: 3Racha; Backbear; Chae Gang-hae; Chan's; Helixx; Hong Ji-sang; Joha; Restart; Space Primates; Versachoi

Stray Kids chronology
Giant (2024)	Hop (2024)	Mixtape: Dominate (2025)

Singles from Hop
- 1. "Walkin on Water" Released: December 13, 2024

Hop (Korean: 合; RR: Hap; lit. ''unity'') is the first mixtape by South Korean boy band Stray Kids, released by JYP Entertainment and Republic Records on December 13, 2024. Marketed as the group's "special album" and first "SKZhop Hiptape" record, the mixtape features songs of "Stray Kids' only new genre", and a guest appearance from Canadian rapper Tablo. 3Racha, an in-house production team of the group, primarily worked on Hop with Restart, Chae Gang-hae, Versachoi, Space Primates, Take a Chance's Chan's and Backbear, Joha, Vendors's Helixx, and Hong Ji-sang.

Hop included "Walkin on Water" as its lead single and the members' solo songs previously debuted on their Dominate World Tour, which all of them contributed to the songwriting. Commercially, the album topped the national album charts in South Korea, Greece, Hungary, Japan, Poland, Portugal and the United States. The mixtape was certified double million by the Korea Music Content Association (KMCA), and gold by the Syndicat national de l'édition phonographique (SNEP) and the Recording Industry Association of America (RIAA).

== Background ==
Stray Kids released a music video for "Megaverse" from their eighth extended play Rock-Star on November 20, 2023, which Canadian rapper Tablo surprisingly appears in a crossword game at the end of the video; fans speculated online that they were preparing for a collaboration. On January 1, 2024, the group uploaded the video "Step Out 2024" to their social media, outlining their accomplishments in previous year and plans for 2024, including "one album and one special album". The "one album" became their ninth extended play, Ate, released on July 19. In support of the EP, Stray Kids embarked on their Dominate World Tour, starting in August, where they premiered the performances of each member's unreleased solo songs: Han's "Hold My Hand", Lee Know's "Youth", Seungmin's "As We Are", Hyunjin's "So Good", Bang Chan's "Railway", I.N's "Hallucination", Felix's "Unfair", and Changbin's "Ultra".

On November 15, the group announced the "special album" Hop via the 24-second "logo splash" teaser video, which depicts red and blue luminous circular objects collide and merge, making strong waves above the water, being seen as a typography combined "合" and "HOP". JYP Entertainment described Hop as the first work of album marketed as "SKZhop Hiptape"—a combination of the group's initials "SKZ" and "hip-hop"—which would "contains 'Stray Kids' only-new-genre' songs that has not been officially defined." The title is a word play between "Hop" from hip-hop music and Hanja "合" (lit. 'unity'), referring to "all Stray Kids members gathered together to complete the songs," which both pronounced hap (합) in Korean.

== Release and promotion ==
Hop was released on December 13, 2024. Pre-orders of the mixtape began on November 15, which came in three versions: Hiptape (limited edition), SKZhop, and Accordion (standard editions), as well as pre-save. Stray Kids posted the mixtape's pre-released promotional itinerary the next day, featuring traditional Korean elements such as hanok door and taegeuk's red and blue. On November 19, the group unveiled digital cover artwork and track list for Hop, which confirmed "Walkin on Water" as the mixtape's lead single, and included a collaboration with Tablo, "U", and each member's solo songs previously performed at the Dominate World Tour. Stray Kids teased snippets of each member's solo tracks via the series "Unveil: Track", as well as "U" via Instagram Reels exclusively, and mashup video for "Walkin on Water", "Bounce Back", and "U".

The three sets of teaser images were uploaded, expressing a mixing and matching of traditional Korean and modern hip-hop cultures. The first, shot at a hanok, shows individual members in hip-hop-styled clothes with traditional Korean props (chromium mask, janggu, hand fan, and gat, etc.) and modern props symbolizing hip-hop (boombox and speaker, etc.), while the group shows reinterpretation of traditional itinerant troupe namsadangpae. The second depicts the members wearing a suit reminiscent of 1990s and 2000s hip-hop and posing against a red, blue, or black background and Korean-styled calligraphy on the white floor. For the third, the group wears white costumes with silvery accessories, bows and arrows, in contrast with the background of hanok.

A day before the release, Stray Kids revealed behind-the-scenes of the mixtape's production via video Intro "Hop", and posted diary-styled post-released promotional itinerary. On the release date, Stray Kids held live event called "SKZhop Hipclub" via YouTube, aimed at introducing Hop and connecting with their fanbase. An accompanying music video for the lead single "Walkin on Water" premiered on December 13, in conjunction with Hop, while music videos for each member's solo songs were uploaded as part of SKZ-Player series throughout December. A pop-up store, selling the mixtape and limited merchandise, opened at Hwigyumjae in Bukchon Hanok Village from December 14 to 22. Despite no promotion on music shows, selected members appeared on web shows Gym Jong Kook, Public TV Dumbass, BuzzFeed, Met Through Dance, and Lean on Me etc. Roblox partnered with Stray Kids for special items on the game.

== Commercial performance ==
Hanteo reported that Hop has sold 1.42 million copies on its first day of the release, and 1.44 million in the third week of December 2024 (December 9 to 15, 2024). The mixtape debuted at number one on the Circle Album Chart for the week of December 8–14, 2024, selling 1,989,508 copies, which 1,853,071 were CD and 136,437 were Nemo Platform, and topped for two consecutive weeks. On February 6, 2025, the mixtape received double million certification from the Korea Music Content Association (KMCA). In Japan, Hop peaked at number one on the Oricon Albums Chart on the week of January 13, 2025.

In the United States, Hop entered the Billboard 200 at number one dated December 28, 2024, becoming the first musical group to make their first six entries to top the chart since the chart establishment in March 1956, and the most number-ones as a group since 2000, tying with BTS, Linkin Park, and Dave Matthews Band. The mixtape earned 187,000 album-equivalent units in its first week, comprising 176,000 pure sales, 10,000 streaming equivalent units (14.83 million on-demand streams), and 1,000 track equivalent units. It is also the 27th mostly non-English-language to reach the top and fourth in 2024, following Twice's With You-th, Stray Kids' Ate, and Ateez's Golden Hour: Part.2. Hop also topped Top Album Sales and Top Current Album Sales for three consecutive weeks, and World Albums for seven non-consecutive weeks. Recording Industry Association of America (RIAA) certified Hop gold for 500,000 units on March 12, 2025, making Stray Kids the most RIAA-certified gold albums by Korean act in the country.

== Track listing ==
Hop track listing
No.	Title	Lyrics	Music	Arrangement	Length
1.	"Walkin on Water"	Bang Chan (3Racha); Changbin (3Racha); Han (3Racha)	Bang Chan; Changbin; Han; Restart; Chae Gang-hae	Restart; Chae; Bang Chan	2:28
2.	"Bounce Back"	Han; Bang Chan	Han; Bang Chan; Versachoi	Bang Chan; Versachoi	3:03
3.	"U" (featuring Tablo)	Bang Chan; Changbin; Han; Tablo; JBach	Bang Chan; Changbin; Han; JBach; Marc Sibley; Nathan Cunningham	Space Primates; Bang Chan	2:43
4.	"Walkin on Water" (Hip version)	Bang Chan; Changbin; Han	Bang Chan; Changbin; Han; Restart; Chae	Restart; Chae; Bang Chan	2:55
5.	"Railway" (Bang Chan)	Bang Chan	Bang Chan; Versachoi	Versachoi; Bang Chan	2:53
6.	"Unfair" (Felix)	Felix	Felix; Versachoi	Versachoi	2:48
7.	"Hallucination" (I.N)	Changbin; I.N; Restart	Changbin; I.N; Restart; Chae	Restart; Chae	2:43
8.	"Youth" (Lee Know)	Danke; Bang Hye-hyun; Lee Know	Chan's (Take a Chance); Backbear (Take a Chance); Celotron (Decade+)	Chan's; Backbear	2:40
9.	"So Good" (Hyunjin)	Hyunjin	Hyunjin; Joha	Joha	2:48
10.	"Ultra" (Changbin)	Changbin	Changbin; Restart; Chae	Restart; Chae	2:27
11.	"Hold My Hand" (Han)	Han	Han; Helixx (Vendors)	Helixx	2:59
12.	"As We Are" (그렇게, 천천히, 우리; Seungmin)	Seungmin; Hong Ji-sang	Seungmin; Hong	Hong	3:33
Total length:					34:05

== Credits and personnel ==
Musicians

- Stray Kids – lead vocals (1–4)
  - Bang Chan (3Racha) – lead vocals (5), background vocals (1–5), instruments (1–2), computer programming (1–2, 5)
  - Lee Know – lead vocals (8)
  - Changbin (3Racha) – lead vocals (10), background vocals (1, 4, 7, 10)
  - Hyunjin – lead vocals (9), background vocals (9)
  - Han (3Racha) – lead vocals (11), background vocals (1–2, 4, 11)
  - Felix – lead vocals (6), background vocals (1, 4)
  - Seungmin – lead vocals (12), background vocals (12)
  - I.N – lead vocals (7), background vocals (7)
- Restart – instruments (1, 7, 10), computer programming (1)
- Chae Gang-hae – instruments (1, 7, 10), computer programming (1)
- Versachoi – instruments (2, 5–6), computer programming (2, 5–6)
- Space Primates – instruments (3)
- Chan's (Take a Chance) – drums (8), bass (8), keyboard (8), synthesizer (8), computer programming (8), vocal directing (8)
- Backbear (Take a Chance) – drums (8), bass (8), keyboard (8), synthesizer (8), computer programming (8)
- One.Ki – chorus (8)
- Joha – instruments (9)
- Zenur (Vendors) – guitar (11)
- Lim Young-woo – string (11)
- Helixx (Vendors) – bass (11), drums (11)
- Hong Ji-sang – computer programming (12), acoustic guitar (12), electric guitar (12), bass (12), keyboard (12)

Technical

- Lee Kyeong-won – digital editing (1–4, 8–9)
- Bang Chan (3Racha) – digital editing (1–2, 4–5), recording (1–2, 4–5)
- Riskypizza – digital editing (2)
- Space Primates – digital editing (3)
- Versachoi – digital editing (5–6), recording (6)
- Restart – digital editing (7, 10), recording (7, 10)
- Chae Gang-hae – digital editing (7, 10)
- Lee Ji-ho – digital editing (11)
- Hong Ji-sang – digital editing (12), recording (12)
- Lee Chang-hoon – recording (1, 4)
- Goo Hye-jin – recording (1, 3–4)
- Kwak Bo-eun – recording (2)
- Seo Eun-il – recording (8)
- Hyunjin – recording (9)
- Helixx (Vendors) – recording (11)
- Eom Se-hee – recording (11)
- Manny Marroquin – mixing (1), mixing in Dolby Atmos (1)
- Yoon Won-kwon – mixing (2–3, 5–7, 10)
- 2Spade – mixing (4), remixing (4), mastering (4)
- MasterKey – mixing (8)
- Stay Tuned – mixing (9)
- Revin – mixing (11)
- Lee Tae-sub – mixing (12)
- Chris Galland – mix engineering (1)
  - Ramiro Fernandez-Seoane – assistant
- Dale Becker – mastering (1)
  - Noah McCorkle – assistant
  - Katie Harvey – assistant
  - Adam Burt – assistant
- Kwon Nam-woo – mastering (2–3, 5–12)
- Shin Bong-won – mixing in Dolby Atmos (2–12)
  - Park Nam-joon – assistant

Locations

- JYPE Studios – recording (1–4, 8, 11), mixing (12)
- Channie's "Room" – recording (1–2, 4–5)
- Jisang's Studio – recording (12)
- Larrabee Studios – mixing (1), mixing in Dolby Atmos (1)
- MadMiix – mixing (2–3, 5–7, 10)
- 821 Sound – mixing (8), mastering (2–3, 5–12)
- Stay Tuned Studio – mixing (9)
- Redzone Studio – mixing (11)
- Becker Mastering – mastering (1)
- GLAB Studios – mixing in Dolby Atmos (2–12)

== Charts ==
=== Weekly charts ===
Weekly chart performance for Hop
Chart (2024–2025)	Peak position
Australian Albums (ARIA)	4
Austrian Albums (Ö3 Austria)	7
Belgian Albums (Ultratop Flanders)	3
Belgian Albums (Ultratop Wallonia)	3
Canadian Albums (Billboard)	62
Croatian International Albums (HDU)	4
Danish Albums (Hitlisten)	22
Dutch Albums (Album Top 100)	35
Finnish Albums (Suomen virallinen lista)	28
French Albums (SNEP)	3
German Albums (Offizielle Top 100)	3
Greek Albums (IFPI)	1
Hungarian Albums (MAHASZ)	1
Italian Albums (FIMI)	13
Japanese Albums (Oricon)	1
Japanese Combined Albums (Oricon)	1
Japanese Hot Albums (Billboard Japan)	8
Lithuanian Albums (AGATA)	17
New Zealand Albums (RMNZ)	20
Polish Albums (ZPAV)	1
Portuguese Albums (AFP)	1
South Korean Albums (Circle)	1
Spanish Albums (Promusicae)	9
Swedish Albums (Sverigetopplistan)	42
Swiss Albums (Schweizer Hitparade)	2
UK Albums (Official Charts)	91
US Billboard 200	1
US World Albums (Billboard)	1

=== Monthly charts ===
Monthly chart performance for Hop
Chart (2024)	Position
Japanese Albums (Oricon)	5
South Korean Albums (Circle)	1

=== Year-end charts ===
2024 year-end chart performance for Hop
Chart (2024)	Position
French Albums (SNEP)	188
Global Album Sales (IFPI)	6
Portuguese Albums (AFP)	123
South Korean Albums (Circle)	6

2025 year-end chart performance for Hop
Chart (2025)	Position
Belgian Albums (Ultratop Flanders)	81
Belgian Albums (Ultratop Wallonia)	123
Croatian International Albums (HDU)	27
French Albums (SNEP)	109
German Albums (Offizielle Top 100)	55
Hungarian Albums (MAHASZ)	55
Japanese Albums (Oricon)	40
Japanese Download Albums (Billboard Japan)	59
Swiss Albums (Schweizer Hitparade)	90
US Billboard 200	157
US World Albums (Billboard)	1

== Certifications and sales ==
Certifications and sales for Hop
Region	Certification	Certified units/sales
France (SNEP)	Gold	50,000^{‡}
South Korea (KMCA)	2× Million	2,000,000^{^}
United States (RIAA)	Gold	500,000^{‡}
Summaries
Worldwide (IFPI)	—	1,800,000
^{^} Shipments figures based on certification alone.^{‡} Sales+streaming figures based on certification alone.

== Release history ==
Release dates and formats for Hop
Region	Date	Format	Version	Label	Ref.
Various	December 13, 2024	CD; digital download; streaming	Limited; standard	JYP; Republic	
South Korea	December 13, 2024	Nemo	Nemo	JYP; Republic	
United States	December 17, 2024	Digital download	Exclusive digital	JYP; Republic	

== See also ==
- List of Billboard 200 number-one albums of 2024
- List of Circle Album Chart number ones of 2024
- List of number-one albums of 2024 (Poland)
- List of Oricon number-one albums of 2025
