= Just Breathe (Sky-Hi song) =

Single by Sky-Hi featuring 3Racha

from the album The Debut
- Language: Japanese; English; Korean
- Released: February 21, 2022
- Studio: Prime Sound Studio Form (Tokyo)
- Genre: Trap; hip hop
- Length: 3:50
- Label: Avex
- Songwriters: Sky-Hi; Bang Chan; Changbin; Han; Uta
- Producer: Uta

Sky-Hi singles chronology
"Good 4 U" (2021)	"Just Breathe" (2022)	"Brave Generation" (2022)

Music video
- "Just Breathe" on YouTube

"Just Breathe" (stylized in all caps) is a song recorded in Japanese, English, and Korean by Japanese rapper Sky-Hi, featuring 3Racha, South Korean production team from Stray Kids, taken from Sky-Hi's sixth studio album The Debut. It was released digitally on February 21, 2022, through Avex Entertainment. It is 3Racha's first commercial song.

== Background and release ==
On February 15, 2022, Sky-Hi tweeted "20220221" and his name with the wolf, pig, rabbit, and chipmunk emojis, while Stray Kids tweeted the same numbers and their group name with the sun-behind-small-cloud and backhand-index-pointing-up emojis at the same time. The fans decoded the wolf emoji as Bang Chan, pig and rabbit as Changbin, and chipmunk as Han, which all are from South Korean boy band Stray Kids production team 3Racha. Three days later, they announced to release the single, titled "Just Breathe", featuring 3Racha, on February 21, making it 3Racha's first commercial song after their several mixtapes. The song was revealed for the first time at Sky-Hi's radio show, Imasia.

== Lyrics and composition ==
"Just Breathe" is described as a trap, hip-hop song written in three languages: Japanese, English, and Korean, by Sky-Hi, 3Racha, and Uta. The latter also handles the song's production. Lyrically, the song talks about "the reason for being who I am", showing the sensibilities of the human soul, self-love, and surviving the toughest days of life, and trusting no one except yourself. It was composed in the key of F minor, 113 beats per minute with a running time of three minutes and 50 seconds.

== Commercial performance ==
In Japan, "Just Breathe" entered both Billboard Japan Hot 100 and Oricon Combined Singles Chart at number 50. The song also peaked at number 15 on the Hungarian Single Top 40, and number 11 on the Billboard World Digital Song Sales.

== Music video ==
An accompanying music video for "Just Breathe" premiered on the same date as the single release. Directed by Creative Collective F A T I M A, the music video depicts futuristic racing game based on a playable video game with four avatars representing each artist. It uses clips from gameplay footage of a player manually controlling a motorcycle and a buggy. The video visualizes "the chaos of modern times".

== Accolades ==
Awards and nominations for "Just Breath"
Ceremony	Year	Award	Result	Ref.
MTV Video Music Awards Japan	2022	Best Hip Hop Video	Won	

== Credits and personnel ==
Credits adapted from YouTube.

Locations

- Prime Sound Studio Form – recording
- Daimonion Recordings – mixing
- Bernie Grundman – mastering
- Avex Music Publishing Inc. – publishing
- JYP Publishing (KOMCA) – publishing
- Sony Music Publishing (Japan) Inc. – publishing

Personnel

- Sky-Hi – writer
- Bang Chan (3Racha) – writer
- Changbin (3Racha) – writer
- Han (3Racha) – writer
- Uta – writer, producer
- Hideaki Jinbu – recording
- D.O.I. – mixing
- Mike Bozzi – mastering

Music video

- Creative Collective Fatima – visual director, 3D artist
- C – technical artist, generative design

== Charts ==
Chart performance for "Just Breathe"
Chart (2022)	Peak position
Hungary (Single Top 40)	15
Japan (Japan Hot 100)	50
Japan Combined Singles (Oricon)	50
US World Digital Song Sales (Billboard)	11

== Release history ==
Release dates and formats for "Just Breathe"
Region	Date	Format	Label	Ref.
Various	February 21, 2021	Digital download; streaming	Avex	
