= Hyun-jin =

- Hangul: 현진
- RR: Hyeonjin
- MR: Hyŏnjin
- IPA: [çʌnd͡ʑin]

Hyun-jin, also spelled Hyeon-jin or Hyon-jin, is a Korean given name.

People with this name include:

- Bae Hyun-jin (born 1983), South Korean broadcaster and politician
- Hyunjin (Loona singer) (born Kim Hyun-jin, 2000), South Korean singer, member of girl groups Loona and Loossemble
- Hyunjin (Stray Kids singer) (born Hwang Hyun-jin, 2000), South Korean rapper, member of boy band Stray Kids
- Kim Ha-eun (born Kim Hyun-jin, 1984), South Korean actress
- Kim Hyun-jin (born 1996), South Korean actor and model
- Lee Hyun-jin (footballer) (born 1984), South Korean football player
- Lee Hyun-jin (actor) (born 1985), South Korean actor
- Hyun Jin Moon (born 1969), South Korean businessman
- Ryu Hyun-jin (born 1987), South Korean baseball pitcher
- Seo Hyun-jin (born 1985), South Korean singer and actress
- Simon Ok Hyun-jin (born 1968), South Korean Roman Catholic priest
- Yong Jae-hyun (born Yong Hyun-jin, 1988), South Korean football player
- Hyunjin (Loona singer) (born Kim Hyun-jin, 2000), South Korean singer, member of girl group Loona

== See also ==
- List of Korean given names
