= Han (musician) =

South Korean singer and rapper (born 2000)

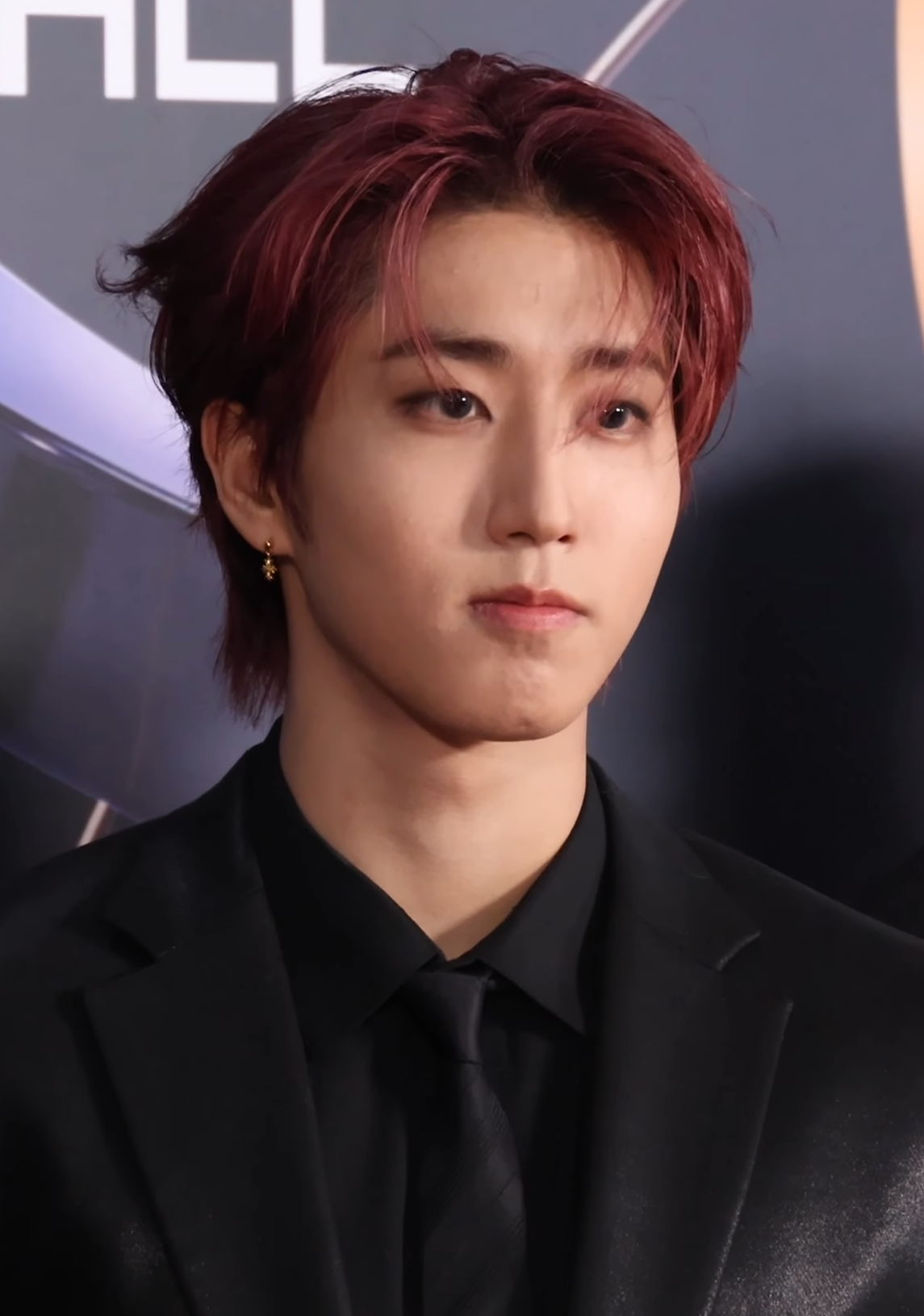
- Han in June 2026
- Born: Han Ji-sung; September 14, 2000 (age 26); Incheon, South Korea
- Other name: J.One
- Occupations: Rapper; singer; songwriter; producer
- Works: Songs written
- Musical career
- Genres: K-pop; hip hop; electronica; R&B
- Years active: 2017–present
- Label: JYP
- Member of: Stray Kids; 3Racha

Korean name
- Hangul: 한지성
- RR: Han Jiseong
- MR: Han Chisŏng

Signature
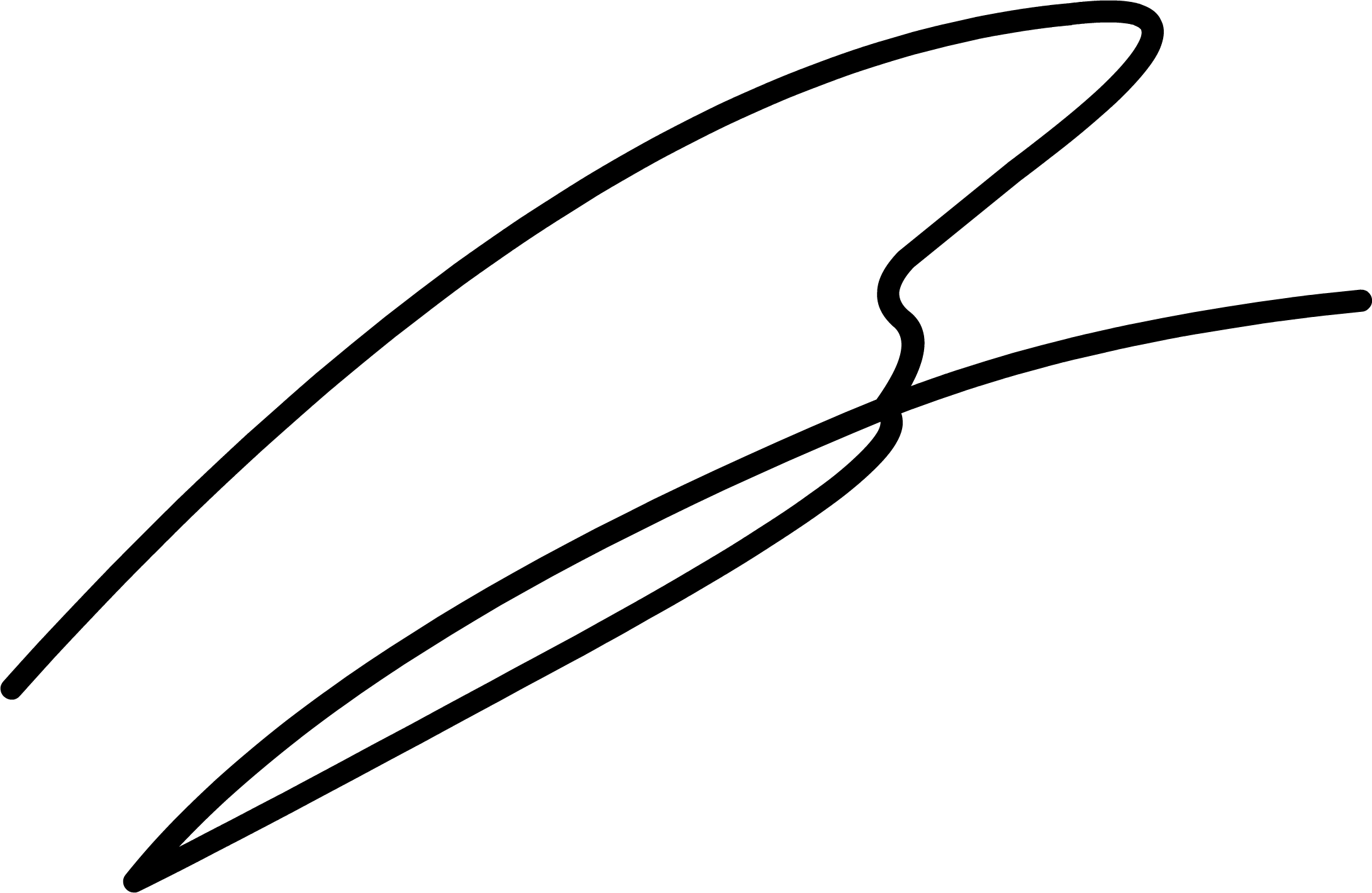

Han Ji-sung (Korean: 한지성; born September 14, 2000), known as Han, is a South Korean rapper, singer, songwriter, and producer. He is a member of the South Korean boy band Stray Kids and its production unit 3Racha under JYP Entertainment.

Han has been a full member of the Korea Music Copyright Association since February 2023, becoming the youngest K-pop idol to be awarded such membership. As of May 2026, he has registered 196 songwriting and production credits, including works for NiziU, Show Lo, Yao Chen, JO1, Nexz, and Modyssey, as well as collaborations with artists such as Lil Durk, Sky-Hi, Tiger JK, and Lisa.

== Early life and education ==
Han Ji-sung was born on September 14, 2000, in Incheon, South Korea as the younger of two sons. His family moved to Mokpo when he was very young, and he attended elementary school there. Later, his family relocated to Malaysia, where he briefly attended Fairview International School before leaving to be homeschooled.

At fourteen, Han returned to South Korea intending to audition to become a K-pop idol, while also committing to pass all three levels of the Korean Qualification Exam as part of a promise to his parents that he would return to Malaysia to pursue further education if he was not successful at auditioning within twelve months. Three months after he had returned to South Korea, Han initially auditioned for JYP Entertainment and following a second audition, was accepted as a trainee.

After debuting, Han enrolled at Gukje Cyber University, to study performance and broadcast entertainment.

== Career ==
=== 2017–present: Stray Kids and 3Racha ===
While a JYP Entertainment trainee, Han attended Def Music Academy in Gangnam District. He co-founded 3Racha with bandmates Bang Chan and Changbin after they took MIDI classes together. Formed in 2016, they serve as the primary production team for Stray Kids, contributing significantly to the group's musical output.

Prior to making their official debut, 3Racha released three mix-tapes on SoundCloud: J:/2017/mixtape on January 18, 2017. The second mix-tape, 3Days on August 16, 2017, featuring Han's solo track, "I See", under the alias J.One, and, Horizon on December 21, 2017. Several pre-debut songs were later reworked as Stray Kids' B-sides.

In the later half of 2017, Han participated in the reality competition series Stray Kids. Han officially debuted with Stray Kids on March 25, 2018, with the debut extended play (EP) I Am Not. 3Racha made no further releases on SoundCloud until the release of the song "Carpe Diem" on January 18, 2020 to commemorate their third anniversary.

In February 2023, alongside fellow members of 3Racha, Han was promoted from associate to full member of the Korea Music Copyright Association (KOMCA), making him, at age 22, the youngest K-pop idol to be awarded membership. As of August 2026, Han had credits for 204 songs registered with KOMCA. This places him behind bandmates Bang Chan and Changbin among fourth-generation idols, and among the top ten most credited K-pop idols overall. He is also the eighth-most credited K-pop idol overall.

In summer of 2024, a year ahead of its expected expiration, it was announced that alongside his bandmates, Han had renewed his group contract with JYP Entertainment.

=== 2019–present: Solo and subunit activities ===
In 2019, Han appeared on episode 197 of King of Masked Singer, competing under the alias Imgeokjjeong. In October 2022, he appeared on episode 32 of LeeMujin Service where he performed a jazz-inspired remix of Stray Kids' then-new release "Case 143", as well as songs by Twice, YB, and Se So Neon.

Individually, Han has participated in special performances for Korean music festivals, including a cover of SSAK3's "Play That Summer" with Lia of Itzy and Juyeon of The Boyz at MBC Music Festival 2020, and a cover of Kim Sung-jae's "As I Told You" with bandmates Hyunjin and Felix at KBS Song Festival 2022.

As part of 3Racha, Han has performed with N.Flying at 2019 KCON LA, and on a remix of their pre-debut track "Runner's High" at 2019 KCON Thailand with Soyeon of (G)I-DLE and Hongjoong of Ateez. 3Racha have also given numerous performances, whether as an introduction, outro, or act independent of wider Stray Kids sets at the MAMA Awards, including a special stage at MAMA 2022 with Tiger JK and Jung Jae-il.

In February 2022, 3Racha announced their first official guest single "Just Breathe", a collaboration with Japanese rapper SKY-HI. In September 2022, 3Racha composed the track "Heyday" for the fourth soundtrack compilation of Street Man Fighter.

After a minor car accident which prevented the full Stray Kids lineup from originally performing as intended, Han made his first international festival appearance as part of 3Racha at the Global Citizen Festival 2023 in New York City.

In April 2020, Stray Kids sang the soundtrack for the anime adaptation of Tower of God, with 3Racha writing and composing for the opening theme "Top" and Han himself writing and composing for the ending theme "Slump". In October 2024, Stray Kids were invited back to create theme music for the second season of Tower of God, with Han co-writing and co-composing the opening theme, "Night". In July 2020, all members of 3Racha received writing and composition credits on Stray Kids' second domestic television OST, "Hello Stranger" for the drama Pop Out Boy!. In 2023, "Maniac" and "Venom" (written and produced by 3Racha, and from Stray Kids' sixth EP, Oddinary) were featured in the first season of XO, Kitty.

In April 2024, as part of 3Racha, Han co-produced Stray Kids' first OST for a Japanese drama, "Why?" for Fuji TV's RE: Revenge – At the End of Desire. In July 2024, 3Racha co-wrote and co-produced the Stray Kids song "Slash" for the Deadpool & Wolverine soundtrack, marking Han's first contribution to the soundtrack of a Hollywood cinematic release, and his second major film OST after 3Racha were approached to produce a theme song for Doraemon: Nobita's Sky Utopia. In September 2024, it was announced Stray Kids would perform "Come Play" with Tom Morello of Rage Against the Machine and Young Miko for the second season of Arcane.

In April 2025, it was announced Han had co-written a song for label-mates Nexz, "Run With Me", to be released on their second mini album, O-RLY?.

In March 2026, 3Racha wrote and produced the track "Endless Sun" for Bioré UV's "Sunlight is Your Spotlight" advertising campaign featuring Stray Kids. In April 2026, it was announced 3Racha would write and produce the debut title track "Hook" for MODYSSEY. The song debuted at 74 on the Circle Download Chart.

In May 2026, Han's first official individual guest feature was announced, the forthcoming track "Can't Love" with South Korean indie band Can't Be Blue.

==== SKZ-Record/Player and solo music ====
After debuting, Stray Kids began a YouTube-based non-album singles project, SKZ-Record/Player, where individual members could upload solo and/or sub-unit original songs, cover versions, or dance performances, exploring their own artistic expression beyond the group's collective style. As of May 2026, Han was the most prolific contributor to the project, with thirteen original solo songs (in release order: "Close"; "I Got It"; "Alien"; "Wish You Back"; "Happy"; "Volcano"; "Miserable (You & Me)"; "13"; "Maybe"; "Human"; "Hold My Hand"; "Raining Stars"; and "Back to Life"), three original sub-unit songs ("Zone", as part of 3Racha; "Want So Bad", a duet with bandmate Lee Know; and "Respirator", a duet with bandmate Seungmin), one original duet with Bae of Nmixx ("1, 2, 3, 4, 5"), and two cover versions (both with bandmate Seungmin and both of songs by Day6). He was also credited as the lyricist and co-composer of "Hold On" and "Into the Current", recorded for the project by Seungmin, and "The Little Things", recorded for the project by I.N.

Six of these, plus a further, previously unheard solo song, "Run", were released to digital platforms as part of Stray Kids' digital compilation album, SKZ-Replay, in December 2022. As of July 2024, the remainder had yet to see wider release, though "Respirator" was performed in March 2024 on the final day of Stray Kids' fourth fan-meeting, SKZ Magic School. "Hold My Hand", first performed in August 2024 as part of Stray Kids' DominATE tour in Seoul, was later released as part of Stray Kids' special album, Hop, in December 2024, with an accompanying music video released to the band's SKZ-Record/Player YouTube project. In March 2025, as part of Stray Kids' digital single album Mixtape: Dominate, Han and Felix released a duet, "Truman"; an accompanying music video was released on the Stray Kids YouTube channel.

As of May 2026, Han has had several additional songs which had neither been released to SKZ-Record/Player nor to wider digital platforms, including "Scissor", which was performed at the Unite ON: Hallyu Festival in 2020, and "Don't Say", which was performed during Stray Kids' 5-Star Dome Tour in 2023, where Han played guitar during concert for the first time.

==== Soundtrack appearances ====
In October 2025, it was announced that together with bandmates Felix and I.N, Han would feature on the soundtrack for Netflix original series, Genie, Make a Wish, with the song "Genie". The song debuted at number 147 on the Circle Download Chart, and reached number 4 on the Billboard World Digital Sales chart. Later the same month, it was announced that Han would be releasing his first solo original soundtrack, "Updraft" (상승기류), for TvN's period drama Typhoon Family, on October 26, 2025. The song debuted at number 92 on the Circle Download Chart, number 68 on the Circle Background Music [BGM] Chart, and number 65 on the Circle V Coloring Chart.

In 2026, it was announced that Han's second solo original track, "Let It Show", would feature in the third season of drama series Yumi's Cells. Released on 21 April 2026, the song debuted at number 115 on the Circle Download Chart, number 121 on the Circle BGM Chart, and number 42 on the Circle V Coloring Chart. It peaked at number 110 on the Circle Download Chart a week later.

== Artistry ==
Han has received positive critical reception in the media for his live performances, specifically regarding his stage presence and choreography.

A multi-instrumentalist, in addition to rapping and vocals, Han plays piano and guitar. As a recording artist, he typically handles songwriting and production for his releases. Consequently, the nickname "ace of the fourth generation" has been applied to Han.

Han has been acknowledged both domestically and internationally, including ranking consistently in Tumblr's K-Pop Stars of the Year, placing sixth in Billboard's 2024 K-Pop Artist 100, and, as part of Stray Kids, being listed as a rising star by Forbes Korea, Gold House, and Time. Additionally, Demi Phillips, writing for We Got This Covered, ranked Han among the best male K-pop singers of all time.

=== Songwriting and production ===
Han has explored diverse genres and melodies. A prolific lyricist and songwriter, Han has numerous unreleased compositions; at one point, he revealed having around 40 archived songs that he set aside, feeling they no longer reflected his artistic growth.

Han has shared that songwriting was initially challenging due to difficulties organizing ideas, but his confidence grew with experience, allowing him to develop ideas more organically. Han draws inspiration from various sources, including film, anime, and reality TV. Han wrote the song "Wish You Back" inspired by the 2016 romantic fantasy film Your Name; the film's director, Makoto Shinkai, described the track as "beautiful". During an appearance on MMTG in 2024, Han expressed interest in composing a follow up to "13" after the EXchange couple who inspired the song, Seo Dong-jin and Song Da-hye, got back together.

Han's lyrics explore themes like love and introspection, and use wordplay, storytelling, mood and symbolism. Writing for NME, Carmen Chin described "Secret Secret", written & composed by Han for Stray Kids' second full-length album Noeasy, as "lyrically stunning".

After Stray Kids' appearance on Kingdom: Legendary War, 3Racha began receiving increased attention for their production and mixing skills, particularly "Pray (I'll Be Your Man)" (originally by BTOB) and "Jasin", a mashup of their own songs ("God's Menu" and "Side Effects"). Speaking on his work writing for Stray Kids, Han has expressed the desire that the band "become a genre" unto themselves, which has been reflected in cultural acknowledgement of the group as fully self-produced, and their influence over the emergence of the "mala (taste)" genre and the direction of the fourth generation of K-pop.

Additionally, Han has managed recording sessions for Stray Kids across many of their album and single releases. He has stated that when vocally directing, his preference remains focused on "bringing out each member's unique qualities" rather than strict adherence to his original ideas.

Besides his contribution to Stray Kids' discography and his individual material, Han has co-written and produced songs for other artists, predominantly artists associated with affiliates or sub-labels of JYP Entertainment. These include Chinese artists Show Lo, Yao Chen, and JO1, and Japanese boy band NEXZ. The song "Paradise", recorded by Japanese girl group NiziU as the theme for Doraemon: Nobita's Sky Utopia in 2023, became the first song produced by 3Racha to hit number 1 on the Billboard Hot 100 Japan.

=== Rapping and vocals ===
As a rapper, Han's delivery has been described as "spitfire". He has been ranked among the fastest rappers in South Korea.

Having taken on increased singing duties for Stray Kids after the departure of the band's original main vocalist in 2019, Han's vocals have garnered positive public and critical reception. He has been described as having a strong vocal delivery, regarding his use of high notes, falsetto, and stable belting.

During Stray Kids' participation in reality competition Kingdom: Legendary War, Han's vocal performance in the group's cover of BTOB's "(Pray) I'll Be Your Man" received positive attention.

Since opening his personal Instagram account in March 2024, Han has posted a variety of cover versions, including songs by Stephen Sanchez, Dean Lewis, tuki, and Silica Gel.

=== Influences and influence ===
Han was inspired to become a rapper by acts such as Tablo of Epik High, Zico of Block B, and Tiger JK, as well as the rap line of BTOB. His father was also previously a rock musician, which influenced Han to appear on both Lee Mujin Service and King of Masked Singer. Han is interested in band music, particularly rock music of diverse sub-genres and languages, including J-Rock bands One Ok Rock and Mrs. Green Apple, Australian pop-rock band 5 Seconds of Summer, and Italian rock act Måneskin, as well as South Korean rock artists including YB, DAY6, and Silica Gel. Additionally, he has explored genres including R&B, bossa nova, and jazz as part of an expressive solo style distinctive from that of Stray Kids as a group.

Han has been cited as an influence or inspiration by artists including Sunwoo of South Korean boyband The Boyz, Jongseob of South Korean boyband P1Harmony, Alan Pasawee of Thai boyband Bus, Kunho of South Korean boyband All(H)Ours, Hyui and Seita of Japanese boyband Nexz, and Make Mate 1 contestant Lee Do-Ha. Additionally, in an interview with FNC Entertainment, Japanese rock fusion act Uverworld named Stray Kids among Korean artists they felt stood out as "high quality" acts breaking down boundaries between idol culture and band culture.

== Awards and recognition ==
At the 2022 MTV Video Music Awards Japan, 3Racha's collaboration with SKY-HI, "Just Breathe", won the award for Best Hip-Hop Video. In 2024, as part of 3Racha, Han received the Best Creator Award at the Asia Artist Awards. Han has received similar nominations (as part of 3Racha) for Best Producer and Best Arranger at the Asian Pop Music Awards, and his work for Stray Kids has also received multiple nominations and awards at ceremonies including Asia Star Entertainer Awards, Billboard Music Awards, Circle Chart Music Awards, Golden Disc Awards, iHeartRadio Music Awards, MAMA, and MTV Video Music Awards.

As part of Stray Kids, Han also received the Prime Minister's Commendation at the 2023 Korean Popular Culture and Arts Awards.

Individually, Han has consistently been the only fourth-generation idol to appear in the top 15 of the Idol Composer Trend Index (아이돌 작곡가 트렌드지수)—spending just one week outside the top 10—through every week of the first four months of 2024.

In July 2024, "Twilight" (또 다시 밤), a song composed by Han and included as a B-side on Stray Kids' EP Ate, was his first solo-composition to hit the Billboard World Digital Sales Chart, debuting at number 10. In April 2025, "Truman", Han's duet with Felix from Stray Kids' single album, Mixtape: Dominate, debuted at number 33 on the Official UK Singles Sales Chart. As of July 31, 2024, he was the most-followed member of Stray Kids on South Korean music service Melon.

== Other ventures ==
=== Style and endorsements ===
In 2024, Han made his first solo fashion appearance by modeling in Balmain for W Korea as the cover star for two issues of a wider Stray Kids themed collection. He went on to wear several pre-release Balmain pieces while performing on tour with Stray Kids later in the year.

In May 2025, Han modeled for NARS Cosmetics as the cover star of Nylon Japan, with a 26-page feature and extended interview. In June 2026, he was chosen to be a brand ambassador for Italian luxury fashion brand Tod's.

=== Philanthropy ===
Han has made group donations with his Stray Kids' bandmates to numerous causes, including social welfare and disaster relief charities. To celebrate his birthday in 2025, Han donated ₩100 million (equivalent to ₩104.49 million or US$77,964.64 in 2025) to Samsung Medical Center to support the treatment of adults, children, and adolescents with severe illness. Again in 2026, he donated ₩100 million (US$74,611.5) to Angel's Haven to support abused children and their residential care.

== Personal life ==
=== Health ===
In 2019, Han took a temporary break from attending secondary promotional activities with Stray Kids following a diagnosis of anxiety.

=== Legal matters ===
On November 4, 2026, JYP Entertainment sued distributor OneSync Media and its founder Miles Gaines in the U.S. District Court for the Central District of California, alleging direct copyright infringement and a DMCA violation. The complaint alleged that OneSync and Gaines copied Stray Kids member Han's "back to life" wholesale from a May 2026 YouTube pre-release, removed its copyright management information, and uploaded it to streaming services under the artist name "yungzzz". Gaines told Digital Music News the recording had been submitted through a third party, he was unaware of the upload, it had since been removed, and OneSync would cooperate through the legal process.

== Discography ==
=== Songs ===
==== As lead artist ====
List of songs, showing year released, selected chart positions, and name of the album
Title	Year	Peak chart positions						Album
Title	Year	KOR DL	JPN DL	NZ Hot	UK Sales	US Rap Dig.	US World	Album
"Zone" (as 3Racha)	2018	—	—	—	—	—	—	SKZ-Replay
"We Go" (as 3Racha)	2020	—	—	—	—	—	10	In Life
"Ice Americano" (with Lee Know)	2020	—	—	—	—	—	—	Non-album single (Note: Released only on YouTube and YouTube Music for Two Kids Song project.)
"Close"	2020	—	—	—	—	—	—	SKZ-Replay
"I Got It"	2020	—	—	—	—	—	—	SKZ-Replay
"Gone Away"	2021	25	—	—	—	—	—	Noeasy
"Alien"	2021	—	—	—	—	—	—	SKZ-Replay
"Wish You Back"	2021	—	—	—	—	—	—	SKZ-Replay
"Happy"	2021	—	—	—	—	—	—	SKZ-Replay
"Muddy Water" (with Changbin, Hyunjin and Felix)	2022	26	—	—	—	—	—	Oddinary
"Heyday" (as 3Racha)	2022	118	—	—	—	—	13	Street Man Fighter Original Vol.4 Crew Songs
"3Racha" (with Bang Chan and Changbin)	2022	36	—	24	—	—	13	Maxident
"Volcano"	2023	—	—	—	—	—	—	Non-album single (Note: Released only on YouTube and YouTube Music for SKZ-Record project.)
"Miserable (You & Me)"	2023	—	—	—	—	—	—	Non-album single
"Want So Bad" (with Lee Know)	2024	—	—	—	—	—	—	Non-album single
"13"	2024	—	—	—	—	—	—	Non-album single
"1, 2, 3, 4, 5" (featuring Bae of Nmixx)	2024	—	—	—	—	—	—	Non-album single
"Respirator" (산소호흡기) (with Seungmin)	2024	—	—	—	—	—	—	Non-album single
"Maybe"	2024	—	—	—	—	—	—	Non-album single
"Human" (사람이니까)	2024	—	—	—	—	—	—	Non-album single
"Hold My Hand"	2024	28	—	—	—	—	9	Hop
"Truman" (with Felix)	2025	141	86	22	33	7	—	Mixtape: Dominate
"Raining Stars" (유성우)	2025	—	—	—	—	—	—	SKZ-Replay 2026 Pt.1
"Back to Life"	2026	—	—	32	—	—	6	Non-album single
"Don't Say"	2026	—	—	—	—	—	—	SKZ-Replay 2026 Pt.1
"—" denotes a recording that did not chart or was not released in that region.

==== As featured artist ====
Title	Year	Peak chart positions				Album
Title	Year	HUN	JPN Cmb.	JPN Hot	US World	Album
"Just Breathe" (Sky-Hi featuring 3Racha)	2022	15	50	50	11	The Debut
"Can't Love" (Can't Be Blue featuring Han)	2026	—	—	—	—	Can't Be Blue
"—" denotes a recording that did not chart or was not released in that region.

=== Soundtrack appearances ===
List of soundtrack appearances, with selected chart positions, showing year released and album title
Title	Year	Peak chart positions		Album
Title	Year	KOR	US World	Album
"Genie" (with Felix and I.N)	2025	— (Note: "Genie" did not chart on the Circle Digital Chart but peaked at number 147 on the Download Chart.)	4	Genie, Make a Wish OST Part.1
"Updraft" (상승기류)	2025	— (Note: "Updraft" did not enter the Circle Digital Chart, but peaked at number 92 on the Download Chart, number 68 on the BGM Chart, and number 65 on the V Coloring Chart.)	—	Typhoon Family OST Part.3
"Let It Show"	2026	—	—	Yumi's Cells Season 3 OST Part.3
"—" denotes a recording that did not chart or was not released in that region.

== Videography ==
=== Music videos ===
Title	Year	Artist(s)	Album	Ref.
"Zone"	2018	3Racha	SKZ-Replay	
"Close"	2020	Han	SKZ-Replay	
"Just Breathe"	2022	Sky-Hi featuring 3Racha	The Debut	
"Hold My Hand"	2024	Han	Hop	
"Truman"	2025	Han, Felix	Mixtape: Dominate	
"Genie" (with Felix and I.N)	2025	Han, Felix, I.N	Genie, Make a Wish OST Part. 1	
"Updraft" (상승기류)	2025	Han	Typhoon Family OST Part. 3	
"Let It Show"	2026	Han	Yumi's Cells Season 3 OST Part 3	
"Back to Life"	2026	Han	non-album single	

== Filmography ==
=== Television shows ===
List of TV shows of Han, showing year aired, role, and notes
Year	Title	Role	Episode(s)	Notes	Ref.
2017	Stray Kids	Contestant	all (1-10)	Debuted with Stray Kids	
2019	King of Masked Singer	Contestant	Episode 197	As Imgeokjjeong (Korean: 걱정을 해서 걱정이 사라지면 걱정이 없겠네 임걱정; RR: geokjeongeul haeseo geokjeongi sarajimyeon geokjeongi eopgenne imgeokjeong; lit. 'If you worry and your worries go away, you won't have any worries')	
2019	Show! Music Core	Special MC	Episode 697	October 10, 2019	
2021	Loud	Special Guest	Episode 14	as part of 3Racha, joined contestants to perform a remixed version of "Back Door"	
2022	Show! Music Core	Special MC	Episode 760	March 26, 2022	
2022	Show! Music Core	Special MC	Episode 783	October 22, 2022	
2023	Street Woman Fighter 2	Special Guest Judge	Episode 4	appeared with Bang Chan and Changbin as guest judges for the "JYP Match" of the "K-Pop Death Match" mission	
2023	Nizi Project Season 2	Special Guest Judge	finale	appeared on the judging panel with Bang Chan and Changbin	

== Awards and nominations ==
Name of the award ceremony, year presented, award category, nominee(s) of the award, and the result of the nomination
Award ceremony	Year	Category	Nominee(s)/work(s)	Result	Ref.
Korea Grand Music Awards	2026	Best OST	"Let It Show"	Pending	
Seoul Music Awards	2026	Original Sound Track	"Updraft"	Nominated	
