= Deadpool & Wolverine (soundtrack) =

2024 soundtrack album

Deadpool & Wolverine (Original Motion Picture Soundtrack) (also known as Deadpool & Wolverine: Van Jamz) is the soundtrack album for the Marvel Studios film Deadpool & Wolverine. It was released by Hollywood Records on July 24, 2024, with a physical release on July 26. A separate film score album, Deadpool & Wolverine (Original Score), composed by Rob Simonsen, was released digitally on July 24 with a regular edition and a deluxe that also includes the soundtrack album. Madonna's 1989 single "Like a Prayer" is heavily featured in the film, but is excluded from the official soundtrack release; an EP, titled Deadpool & Wolverine: Madonna's "Like a Prayer" EP, was released by Warner Records on August 9, 2024.

== Deadpool & Wolverine (Original Motion Picture Soundtrack) ==
Deadpool & Wolverine (Original Motion Picture Soundtrack)
- Standard edition cover

Soundtrack album by various artists
- Released: July 24, 2024
- Genres: Pop; dance-pop; pop rock; country; soft rock
- Length: 61:52
- Labels: Hollywood; Marvel Music
- Producer: Various

=== Background ===
The soundtrack was announced on July 17, 2024, with the complete track list of 18 songs. It features contributions from NSYNC, Stray Kids, Fergie, the Platters, Huey Lewis and the News, Aretha Franklin and Green Day amongst others. Stray Kids performed the original song "Slash", which was released one day ahead of the soundtrack on July 23 as a promotional single.

Stray Kids, who competed and placed first in the Korean music reality show Kingdom: Legendary War (2021) performed a mashup of "God's Menu" and Blackpink's "Ddu-Du Ddu-Du" with Felix dressed as Deadpool, thereby paying homage to the character and the film; the band and Ryan Reynolds, who plays Deadpool, shared a mutual rapport in social media platforms. Reynolds wanted the band to appear in a sequence in the film, but due to the 2023 Hollywood labor disputes, it was logistically impossible.

The film and the soundtrack also featured "The Greatest Show" from the soundtrack of The Greatest Showman (2017), which also starred Wolverine actor Hugh Jackman who performed it with Zendaya, Zac Efron, Keala Settle, and that film's ensemble cast. The 1978 single "You're the One That I Want" performed by John Travolta and Olivia Newton-John for the soundtrack to Grease (1978) was also heard in the film.

=== Reception ===
Pete Hammond of Deadline Hollywood wrote "Musically, though, it is the needle drops that really rock". Vicky Jessop of Evening Standard and Cory Woodroof of For The Win (USA Today) called it as "excellent" and "winningly brash".

=== Track listing ===
Deadpool & Wolverine (Original Motion Picture Soundtrack) track listing
No.	Title	Writer(s)	Artist(s)	Length
1.	"Only You (And You Alone)"	Buck Ram	The Platters	2:43
2.	"Bye Bye Bye"	Kristian Lundin; Jake Schulze; Andreas Carlsson	NSYNC	3:19
3.	"Angel of the Morning"	Chip Taylor	Merrilee Rush	3:10
4.	"Slash"	Bang Chan (3Racha); Changbin (3Racha); Han (3Racha); Versachoi	Stray Kids	3:11
5.	"Glamorous"	Stacy Ferguson; Jamal Jones; William Adams; Elvis Williams; Christopher Bridges	Fergie	2:57
6.	"Iris"	John Rzeznik	Goo Goo Dolls	4:50
7.	"The Power of Love"	Huey Lewis; Chris Hayes; Johnny Colla	Huey Lewis and the News	3:53
8.	"I'm a Ramblin' Man"	Ray Pennington	Waylon Jennings	2:46
9.	"You Belong to Me"	Chilton Price; Pee Wee King; Redd Stewart	Patsy Cline (featuring The Jordanaires)	3:03
10.	"The Lady in Red"	Chris de Burgh	Chris de Burgh	4:18
11.	"I'm with You"	Avril Lavigne; Lauren Christy; Scott Spock; Graham Edwards	Avril Lavigne	3:44
12.	"The Greatest Show" (From The Greatest Showman – Soundtrack Version)	Benj Pasek and Justin Paul; Ryan Lewis	Zac Efron; Zendaya; Hugh Jackman; Keala Settle; The Greatest Showman Ensemble	5:02
13.	"You're the One That I Want"	John Farrar	John Travolta; Olivia Newton-John	2:50
14.	"I'll Be Seeing You"	Sammy Fain (music); Irving Kahal (lyrics)	Jimmy Durante	3:11
15.	"Make Me Lose Control"	Eric Carmen; Dean Pitchford	Eric Carmen	4:45
16.	"You're All I Need to Get By" (with the Royal Philharmonic Orchestra)	Nickolas Ashford; Valerie Simpson	Aretha Franklin	3:35
17.	"Good Riddance (Time of Your Life)"	Billie Joe Armstrong	Green Day	2:36
18.	"LFG (Theme from Deadpool & Wolverine)"	Rob Simonsen	Rob Simonsen	1:59
Total length:				61:52

=== Charts ===
Chart performance for Deadpool & Wolverine (Original Motion Picture Soundtrack)
Chart (2024)	Peak position
Australian Albums (ARIA)	16
Belgian Albums (Ultratop Flanders)	93
Belgian Albums (Ultratop Wallonia)	73
Japanese Albums (Oricon)	49
Japanese Digital Albums (Oricon)	18
Japanese Hot Albums (Billboard Japan)	30
Spanish Albums (Promusicae)	85
UK Compilation Albums (Official Charts)	6
UK Soundtrack Albums (Official Charts)	1
US Billboard 200	119
US Soundtrack Albums (Billboard)	4

=== Release history ===
Release dates and formats for Deadpool & Wolverine (Original Motion Picture Soundtrack)
Region	Date	Editions	Format(s)	Label	Ref.
Various	July 24, 2024	Standard	Digital download; streaming	Hollywood; Marvel Music	
Various	July 26, 2024	Standard	CD; vinyl	Hollywood; Marvel Music	
Various	July 26, 2024	Deluxe	Digital download; streaming; CD; vinyl	Hollywood; Marvel Music	

== Deadpool & Wolverine (Original Score) ==
Deadpool & Wolverine (Original Score)

Film score by Rob Simonsen
- Released: July 24, 2024
- Studio: Abbey Road
- Genre: Film score
- Length: 61:51
- Labels: Hollywood; Marvel Music

Rob Simonsen chronology
Good Grief (2023)	Deadpool & Wolverine (Original Score) (2024)	It Ends with Us (2024)

=== Background ===
Rob Simonsen composed the film score after previously working with director Shawn Levy on The Adam Project (2022) and the fourth season of Stranger Things. Simonsen admitted that the film's "exhaustingly funny" tone and irreverence guided his musical landscape where "in some ways, the stakes [for me] are less — they're pretty high — but just the ability to have fun"; the film experiences numerous tonal shifts, where it goes from orchestral and emotional, to wacky and weird, admitting it as a "pretty broad canvas to be able to paint on". Simonsen never met Levy in person and the latter supervised the film score through Zoom and FaceTime.

=== Reception ===
Zanobard Reviews assigned 6/10 to the score and wrote "Rob Simonsen's Deadpool & Wolverine score is… an interesting effort, for sure [...] But the main theme is kinda not as interesting as you'd want it to be, the action is a tad generic and the quieter moments are just kind of all right so overall – it's difficult to have much to say about it."

=== Track listing ===
All music composed by Rob Simonsen except where noted.

No.	Title	Length
1.	"LFG (Theme from Deadpool & Wolverine)"	1:49
2.	"Deadpool Has a Theme"	2:29
3.	"It's Been a While"	0:39
4.	"Reaching Too High"	2:15
5.	"Make a Wish"	1:26
6.	"Walk with Me" ( (Note: This track references Alan Silvestri's theme from The Avengers (2012).))	2:27
7.	"Two Choices"	2:32
8.	"Eating My Feelings"	2:30
9.	"They're Coming"	2:26
10.	"Family Feud"	0:51
11.	"I Love This Part"	2:13
12.	"Finger-Lickin' Dead-Inside Pixie Slab of Third Rate Dime-Store Nut-Milk"	3:05
13.	"Your Fingers Are Inside Me, But Not in a Good Way"	3:41
14.	"You Were Chest F'd by a Tree"	0:34
15.	"Hideout"	1:52
16.	"That's Her" ( (Note: This track references Marco Beltrami's theme from Logan (2017).))	0:52
17.	"The Heroes We Were"	1:04
18.	"You Were Always the Wrong Guy"	3:24
19.	"Name for Myself"	2:02
20.	"Death or Enslavement"	1:49
21.	"I Walked Away"	2:11
22.	"My Brother Loved You"	3:29
23.	"We Have Company"	2:56
24.	"I Called Some Friends"	1:01
25.	"Steadily Great Since Endgame"	1:29
26.	"Enjoy My Peter"	1:11
27.	"Let's Up the Stakes"	2:11
28.	"He's Not Gonna Make It"	3:18
29.	"Ripper Carnage"	1:01
30.	"There's Nothing to Fix"	1:24
31.	"Special Sock"	2:11
32.	"Name for Myself" (alternate version)	1:33
33.	"Fallen Heroes"	3:15
Total length:		61:51

== Deadpool & Wolverine: Madonna's "Like a Prayer" EP ==
Deadpool & Wolverine: Madonna's "Like a Prayer" EP

EP by Madonna and various artists
- Released: August 9, 2024
- Length: 11:00
- Label: Warner
- Producers: Madonna; Patrick Leonard; Rob Simonsen

Madonna chronology
Finally Enough Love: 50 Number Ones (2022)	Deadpool & Wolverine: Madonna's "Like a Prayer" EP (2024)	Veronica Electronica (2025)

"Like a Prayer" by Madonna is used in the film, and was heavily featured in trailers and promotional material. Reynolds, Jackman, and Levy sought permission from Madonna, who offered notes on the scene where they wanted to integrate the song. However, the song is not included in the soundtrack album, as Madonna declined to give permission. On August 9, 2024, an EP titled Deadpool & Wolverine: Madonna's "Like a Prayer" EP, was released by Warner Records, including the original version of "Like a Prayer", along with two versions produced for the film – the "Battle Royale Mix" and the "Choir Version" performed by the "I'll Take You There Choir". The "Choir" version of the song reached the summit on TikTok Billboard Top 50.

=== Track listing ===
All lyrics are written by Madonna; all music is composed by Patrick Leonard.

No.	Title	Producer(s)	Length
1.	"Like a Prayer" (performed by)	Madonna; Patrick Leonard	5:40
2.	"Like a Prayer – Battle Royale Mix from Deadpool & Wolverine" (performed by Madonna)	Madonna; Leonard; Rob Simonsen	2:48
3.	"Like a Prayer – Choir Version From Deadpool & Wolverine" (performed by I'll Take You There Choir)		2:32
Total length:			11:00

== Additional music ==
The songs "Hells Bells" by AC/DC, "This Is How We Do It" by Montell Jordan, "If This Is It" by Huey Lewis and the News and "Bring Em Out" by T.I. are featured in the film, but not included in the soundtrack album.
