= List of awards and nominations received by Stray Kids =

Stray Kids awards and nominations
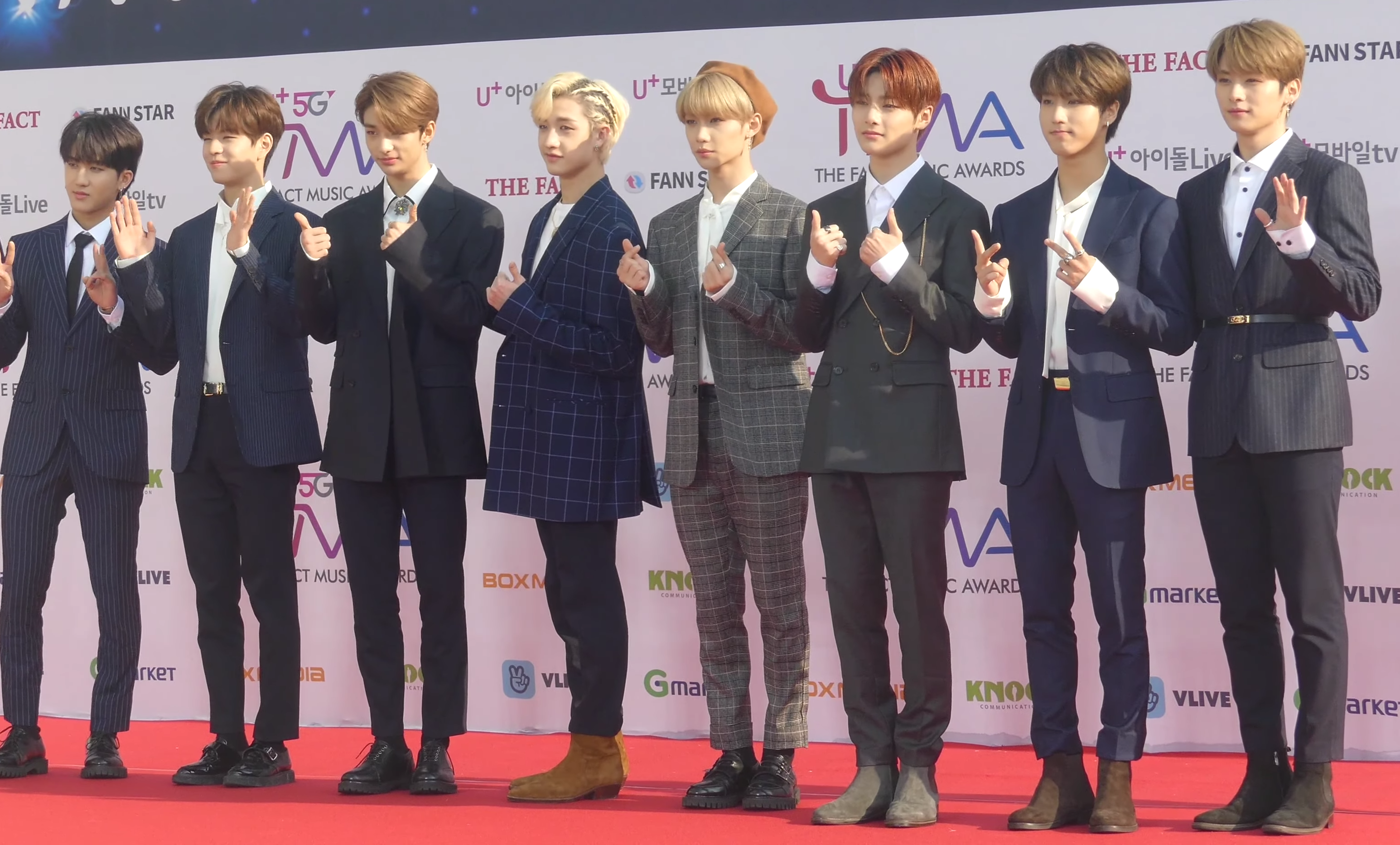
- Stray Kids at The Fact Music Awards in April 2019; L-R: Changbin, Seungmin, Hyunjin, Bang Chan, Felix, I.N, Han, and Lee Know.
Awards and nominations
Award	Wins	Nominations
American Music Awards	0	2
Asia Artist Awards	17	22
Asia Model Awards	3	3
Asia Star Entertainer Awards	4	4
Asian Pop Music Awards	5	20
Berlin Music Video Awards	0	1
Billboard Music Awards	2	6
Circle Chart Music Awards	6	14
D Awards	0	1
The Fact Music Awards	13	14
Genie Music Awards	1	6
Golden Disc Awards	10	24
Hanteo Music Awards	13	31
iHeartRadio Music Awards	3	6
Japan Gold Disc Award	8	8
K-Global Heart Dream Awards	3	3
Joox Thailand Music Awards	0	1
K-World Dream Awards	5	7
Korea Broadcasting Prizes	1	1
Korea First Brand Awards	3	3
Korea Grand Music Awards	7	18
Korea Popular Music Awards	0	2
Korean Brand of the Year Awards	1	6
MAMA Awards	10	44
Melon Music Awards	0	5
Mnet Japan Fan's Choice Awards	1	1
MTV Europe Music Award	1	3
MTV Video Music Awards	1	5
MTV Video Music Awards Japan	1	1
Music Awards Japan	0	1
Nickelodeon Kids' Choice Awards	1	2
Nickelodeon Mexico Kids' Choice Awards	1	1
People's Choice Awards	1	1
Seoul Music Awards	5	35
Short Shorts Film Festival & Asia	1	1
Soompi Awards	1	2
Soribada Best K-Music Awards	3	3
Space Shower Music Awards	0	1
TMELive International Music Awards	2	2
V Live Awards	2	2
Visionary Awards	1	1

Totals (Note: Certain award groups do not simply award one winner. They acknowledge several different recipients, have runners-up, and have third place. Since this is a specific recognition and is different from losing an award, runner-up mentions are considered wins in this award tally. For simplification and to avoid errors, each award in this list has been presumed to have had a prior nomination.)
- Wins: 112
- Nominations: 270

Stray Kids is a South Korean boy band under record label JYP Entertainment, formed through the reality show of the same name. The group consists of eight members: Bang Chan, Lee Know, Changbin, Hyunjin, Han, Felix, Seungmin, and I.N.

The group debuted with their second extended play (EP) I Am Not on March 25, 2018, following their pre-debut EP Mixtape, consisting of music from the Stray Kids series and released in January 2018. The group released two more EPs in 2018—I Am Who in August and I Am You in October, with a positive commercial reception. The four EPs earned the group six new artist awards in 2018 and early 2019, including Best New Male Artist at the 2018 Mnet Asian Music Awards, Best New Artist at the 33rd Golden Disc Awards, and Rookie of the Year at the 28th Seoul Music Awards and 2018 Asia Artist Awards. I Am Who also gave Stray Kids their first bonsang (Note: A bonsang (Korean: 본상), which translates to "main prize", is a major award given at a South Korean award ceremony.) nomination at the 33rd Golden Disc Awards, for the Disc Bonsang. In addition, its lead single, "My Pace", received a Global Fan's Choice nomination at the 2018 Mnet Asian Music Awards. In 2019, the group released two more EPs—Clé 1: Miroh in March and Clé: Levanter in December—with the former receiving a reissue titled Clé 2: Yellow Wood in June. Clé 1: Miroh gave Stray Kids their first daesang (Note: A daesang, (Korean: 대상) which translates to "grand prize", is the highest honor given out at South Korean music award ceremonies in recognition of the artist(s) with the greatest physical and digital achievements for the year.) nomination at the 29th Seoul Music Awards, for the main award, and Album of the Year – 1st Quarter at the 2020 Gaon Chart Music Awards.

Stray Kids has also received two nominations for Artist of the Year, one at the Mnet Asian Music Awards and the other at the Genie Music Awards, and both in 2018. At the 2019 Asia Artist awards, Stray Kids won the Star15 Popularity Award, becoming the group's first popularity accolade.

== Awards and nominations ==
Name of the award ceremony, year presented, award category, nominee(s) of the award, and the result of the nomination
Award ceremony	Year	Category	Nominee(s)/work(s)	Result	Ref.
American Music Awards	2025	Favorite K-Pop Artist	Stray Kids	Nominated	
American Music Awards	2026	Best Male K-Pop Artist	Stray Kids	Nominated	
Asia Artist Awards	2018	Popularity Award	Stray Kids	Longlisted	
Asia Artist Awards	2018	Rookie of the Year	Stray Kids	Won	
Asia Artist Awards	2019	Groove Award	Stray Kids	Won	
Asia Artist Awards	2019	Star15 Popularity Award	Stray Kids	Won	
Asia Artist Awards	2020	Best Music Video Award	Stray Kids	Won	
Asia Artist Awards	2021	Performance of the Year (Daesang)	Stray Kids	Won	
Asia Artist Awards	2021	U+ Idol Live Popularity Award	Stray Kids	Nominated	
Asia Artist Awards	2021	Male Idol Group Popularity Award	Stray Kids	Nominated	
Asia Artist Awards	2022	Album of the Year (Daesang)	Stray Kids	Won	
Asia Artist Awards	2022	Best Choice Award	Stray Kids	Won	
Asia Artist Awards	2023	Stage of the Year (Daesang)	Stray Kids	Won	
Asia Artist Awards	2023	Fabulous Award	Stray Kids	Won	
Asia Artist Awards	2023	Best Creator Award	3Racha	Won	
Asia Artist Awards	2024	Best K-pop Record Award	Stray Kids	Won	
Asia Artist Awards	2024	WhosFandom Award	Stray Kids	Nominated	
Asia Artist Awards	2025	Artist of the Year	Stray Kids	Won	
Asia Artist Awards	2025	Best Artist	Stray Kids	Won	
Asia Artist Awards	2025	Best K-Pop Record	Stray Kids	Won	
Asia Artist Awards	2025	Popularity Award (Male Group)	Stray Kids	Won	
Asia Artist Awards	2025	Best Producer	3Racha	Won	
Asia Artist Awards	2025	Album of the Year	Karma	Won	
Asia Artist Awards	2026	Popularity Award (Male Group)	Stray Kids	Pending	
Asia Model Awards (Note: Co-sponsored by the AMOF Organizing Committee, the Korea Model Association, and MK Sports, the Asia Model Awards is designed to award the best of Asia's celebrities.)	2019	New Star Award	Stray Kids	Won	
Asia Star Entertainer Awards	2024	Grand Prize (Daesang)	Stray Kids	Won	
Asia Star Entertainer Awards	2024	Best Group	Stray Kids	Won	
Asia Star Entertainer Awards	2024	Album of the Year	5-Star	Won	
Asia Star Entertainer Awards	2026	The Best Group (Male)	Stray Kids	Won	
Asian Pop Music Awards	2022	Best Group (Overseas)	Stray Kids	Nominated	
Asian Pop Music Awards	2022	People's Choice Award	Stray Kids	Won	
Asian Pop Music Awards	2022	Best Album of the Year (Overseas)	Maxident	Nominated	
Asian Pop Music Awards	2022	Best Arranger (Overseas)	"Case 143"	Nominated	
Asian Pop Music Awards	2023	Best Album of the Year (Overseas)	5-Star	Nominated	
Asian Pop Music Awards	2023	Record of the Year (Overseas)	5-Star	Nominated	
Asian Pop Music Awards	2023	Best Group (Overseas)	5-Star	Won	
Asian Pop Music Awards	2023	Top 20 Albums of the Year	5-Star	Won	
Asian Pop Music Awards	2023	Best Collaboration (Overseas)	"Social Path"	Nominated	
Asian Pop Music Awards	2023	Best Music Video (Overseas)	"S-Class"	Nominated	
Asian Pop Music Awards	2023	Best Arranger (Overseas)	"S-Class"	Nominated	
Asian Pop Music Awards	2023	Top 20 Songs of the Year	"S-Class"	Won	
Asian Pop Music Awards	2023	Best Producer (Overseas)	3Racha	Nominated	
Asian Pop Music Awards	2024	Best Album of the Year (Overseas)	Ate	Nominated	
Asian Pop Music Awards	2024	Best Group (Overseas)	Ate	Nominated	
Asian Pop Music Awards	2024	Record of the Year (Overseas)	"Chk Chk Boom"	Nominated	
Asian Pop Music Awards	2024	Best OST (Overseas)	"Slash"	Nominated	
Asian Pop Music Awards	2025	Record of the Year	"Ceremony"	Nominated	
Asian Pop Music Awards	2025	Best Group	Karma	Nominated	
Asian Pop Music Awards	2025	Top 20 Albums of the Year	Karma	Won	
Berlin Music Video Awards	2026	Best VFX	"Bleep"	Nominated	
Billboard Music Awards	2023	Top Global K-Pop Artist	Stray Kids	Nominated	
Billboard Music Awards	2023	Top K-Pop Album	5-Star	Won	
Billboard Music Awards	2024	Top Duo/Group	Stray Kids	Nominated	
Billboard Music Awards	2024	Top Global K-Pop Artist	Stray Kids	Won	
Billboard Music Awards	2024	Top K-Pop Album	Rock-Star	Nominated	
Billboard Music Awards	2024	Top K-Pop Album	Ate	Nominated	
Circle Chart Music Awards	2019	New Artist of the Year	Stray Kids	Won	
Circle Chart Music Awards	2020	Album of the Year – 1st Quarter	Clé 1: Miroh	Nominated	
Circle Chart Music Awards	2020	World Rookie of the Year	Stray Kids	Won	
Circle Chart Music Awards	2021	Album of the Year – 1st Quarter	Clé: Levanter	Nominated	
Circle Chart Music Awards	2021	The Hot Performance of This Year	Stray Kids	Won	
Circle Chart Music Awards	2021	Mubeat Global Choice Awards	Stray Kids	Nominated	
Circle Chart Music Awards	2022	Album of the Year – 3rd Quarter	Noeasy	Nominated	
Circle Chart Music Awards	2022	Album of the Year – 4th Quarter	Christmas EveL	Nominated	
Circle Chart Music Awards	2022	World K-Pop Star	Stray Kids	Won	
Circle Chart Music Awards	2023	Album of the Year – 2nd Quarter	Oddinary	Nominated	
Circle Chart Music Awards	2023	Album of the Year – 4th Quarter	Maxident	Won	
Circle Chart Music Awards	2023	Song of the Year – March	"Maniac"	Nominated	
Circle Chart Music Awards	2023	Song of the Year – October	"Case 143"	Nominated	
Circle Chart Music Awards	2024	Artist of the Year – Album	5-Star	Won	
D Awards	2026	Album of the Year (Daesang)	Karma	Won	
The Fact Music Awards	2018	Next Leader Award	Stray Kids	Won	
The Fact Music Awards	2019	Year Dance Performer	Stray Kids	Won	
The Fact Music Awards	2020	Global Hottest Award	Stray Kids	Won	
The Fact Music Awards	2021	Artist of the Year (Bonsang)	Stray Kids	Won	
The Fact Music Awards	2021	Fan N Star Choice Award (Artist)	Stray Kids	Nominated	
The Fact Music Awards	2022	Artist of the Year (Bonsang)	Stray Kids	Won	
The Fact Music Awards	2022	Fan N Star Four Star Award	Stray Kids	Won	
The Fact Music Awards	2023	Artist of the Year (Bonsang)	Stray Kids	Won	
The Fact Music Awards	2023	Fan N Star Four Star Award	Stray Kids	Won	
The Fact Music Awards	2024	Fan N Star Four Star Award	Stray Kids	Won	
The Fact Music Awards	2025	Honor of the Year (Daesang)	Stray Kids	Won	
The Fact Music Awards	2025	Record of the Year (Daesang)	Stray Kids	Won	
The Fact Music Awards	2025	Artist of the Year (Bonsang)	Stray Kids	Won	
The Fact Music Awards	2025	TMA Popularity Award	Stray Kids	Won	
Genie Music Awards	2018	Artist of the Year	Stray Kids	Nominated	
Genie Music Awards	2018	Genie Music Popularity Award	Stray Kids	Nominated	
Genie Music Awards	2018	Male Rookie Award	Stray Kids	Won	
Genie Music Awards	2020	Artist of the Year	Stray Kids	Nominated	
Genie Music Awards	2022	Best Male Group	Stray Kids	Nominated	
Genie Music Awards	2022	Best Male Performance Award	Stray Kids	Nominated	
Golden Disc Awards	2019	Best New Artist	Stray Kids	Won	
Golden Disc Awards	2019	Disc Bonsang	I Am Who	Nominated	
Golden Disc Awards	2020	Disc Bonsang	Clé 1: Miroh	Nominated	
Golden Disc Awards	2020	Popularity Award	Stray Kids	Nominated	
Golden Disc Awards	2021	Best Performance Award	Stray Kids	Won	
Golden Disc Awards	2021	Curaprox Popularity Award	Stray Kids	Nominated	
Golden Disc Awards	2021	Disc Bonsang	In Life	Nominated	
Golden Disc Awards	2021	QQ Music Popularity Award	Stray Kids	Nominated	
Golden Disc Awards	2022	Album Bonsang	Noeasy	Won	
Golden Disc Awards	2022	Album Daesang	Noeasy	Nominated	
Golden Disc Awards	2022	Seezn Golden Disc Most Popular Artist Award	Stray Kids	Nominated	
Golden Disc Awards	2023	Album Bonsang	Maxident	Won	
Golden Disc Awards	2023	Album Daesang	Maxident	Nominated	
Golden Disc Awards	2023	Most Popular Artist	Stray Kids	Won	
Golden Disc Awards	2023	TikTok Golden Disc Most Popular Artist	Stray Kids	Nominated	
Golden Disc Awards	2024	Album Bonsang	5-Star	Won	
Golden Disc Awards	2024	Album Daesang	5-Star	Nominated	
Golden Disc Awards	2024	Global K-Pop Artist Award	Stray Kids	Won	
Golden Disc Awards	2025	Album Bonsang	Ate	Won	
Golden Disc Awards	2025	Album Daesang	Ate	Nominated	
Golden Disc Awards	2025	Most Popular Artist Award (Male)	Stray Kids	Nominated	
Golden Disc Awards	2026	Album Daesang	Karma	Won	
Golden Disc Awards	2026	Album Bonsang	Karma	Won	
Golden Disc Awards	2026	Most Popular Artist – Male	Stray Kids	Nominated	
Hanteo Music Awards	2021	Artist Award – Male Group	Stray Kids	Won	
Hanteo Music Awards	2023	Artist of the Year (Bonsang)	Stray Kids	Won	
Hanteo Music Awards	2023	Best Performance (Daesang)	Stray Kids	Won	
Hanteo Music Awards	2023	Global Artist Award – Japan	Stray Kids	Won	
Hanteo Music Awards	2024	Best Performance (Daesang)	Stray Kids	Won	
Hanteo Music Awards	2024	Artist of the Year (Bonsang)	Stray Kids	Won	
Hanteo Music Awards	2024	Global Artist Award – Africa	Stray Kids	Nominated	
Hanteo Music Awards	2024	Global Artist Award – Europe	Stray Kids	Nominated	
Hanteo Music Awards	2024	Global Artist Award – North America	Stray Kids	Nominated	
Hanteo Music Awards	2024	Global Artist Award – Oceania	Stray Kids	Nominated	
Hanteo Music Awards	2024	Global Artist Award – South America	Stray Kids	Nominated	
Hanteo Music Awards	2025	Artist of the Year (Bonsang)	Stray Kids	Won	
Hanteo Music Awards	2025	Best Artist (Daesang)	Stray Kids	Nominated	
Hanteo Music Awards	2025	Global Artist – Africa	Stray Kids	Nominated	
Hanteo Music Awards	2025	Global Artist – Asia	Stray Kids	Nominated	
Hanteo Music Awards	2025	Global Artist – Europe	Stray Kids	Nominated	
Hanteo Music Awards	2025	Global Artist – North America	Stray Kids	Nominated	
Hanteo Music Awards	2025	Global Artist – Oceania	Stray Kids	Nominated	
Hanteo Music Awards	2025	Global Artist – South America	Stray Kids	Nominated	
Hanteo Music Awards	2025	WhosFandom Award – Male	Stray Kids	Nominated	
Hanteo Music Awards	2026	Best Album (Daesang)	Karma	Won	
Hanteo Music Awards	2026	Artist of the Year (Bonsang)	Stray Kids	Won	
Hanteo Music Awards	2026	Global Artist – Africa	Stray Kids	Won	
Hanteo Music Awards	2026	Global Artist – Asia	Stray Kids	Nominated	
Hanteo Music Awards	2026	Global Artist – Europe	Stray Kids	Won	
Hanteo Music Awards	2026	Global Artist – North America	Stray Kids	Won	
Hanteo Music Awards	2026	Global Artist – Oceania	Stray Kids	Nominated	
Hanteo Music Awards	2026	Global Artist – South America	Stray Kids	Won	
Hanteo Music Awards	2026	WhosFandom Award	Stray Kids	Nominated	
Hanteo Music Awards	2026	Best Popular Artist	Stray Kids	Nominated	
Hanteo Music Awards	2026	Best Global Popular Artist	Stray Kids	Nominated	
iHeartRadio Music Awards	2024	K-Pop Artist of the Year	Stray Kids	Nominated	
iHeartRadio Music Awards	2024	K-Pop Song of the Year	"S-Class"	Nominated	
iHeartRadio Music Awards	2024	K-Pop Album of the Year	5-Star	Won	
iHeartRadio Music Awards	2025	K-pop Song of the Year	"Chk Chk Boom"	Nominated	
iHeartRadio Music Awards	2025	K-pop Album of the Year	Ate	Won	
iHeartRadio Music Awards	2026	K-pop Group of the Year	Stray Kids	Won	
Japan Gold Disc Award	2021	Best 3 New Artist (Asia)	Stray Kids	Won	
Japan Gold Disc Award	2024	Best 5 Singles	Social Path / Super Bowl (Japanese Ver.)	Won	
Japan Gold Disc Award	2025	Best 3 Albums (Asia)	Giant	Won	
Japan Gold Disc Award	2025	Music Video of the Year (Asia)	Stray Kids 2nd World Tour "Maniac" Encore in Japan	Won	
Japan Gold Disc Award	2026	Album of the Year (Asia)	Hollow	Won	
Japan Gold Disc Award	2026	Best 3 Albums (Asia)	Hollow	Won	
Japan Gold Disc Award	2026	Best Artist (Asia)	Stray Kids	Won	
Japan Gold Disc Award	2026	Music Video of the Year (Asia)	Stray Kids Fan Connecting 2024 "SKZ Toy World"	Won	
Joox Thailand Music Awards	2022	Top Social Global Artist of the Year	Stray Kids	Nominated	
K-Global Heart Dream Awards	2023	Best Artist Award	Stray Kids	Won	
K-Global Heart Dream Awards	2023	Bonsang	Stray Kids	Won	
K-Global Heart Dream Awards	2023	4th Generation Boy Group Award	Stray Kids	Won	
K-World Dream Awards	2024	Upick Boy Group Popularity Award	Stray Kids	Nominated	
K-World Dream Awards	2025	Boy Group Best Artist Award (Daesang)	Stray Kids	Won	
K-World Dream Awards	2025	Bonsang	Stray Kids	Won	
K-World Dream Awards	2025	Class Award	Stray Kids	Won	
K-World Dream Awards	2025	Boy Group Popularity Award	Stray Kids	Won	
K-World Dream Awards	2026	K-World Dream Artist Award	Stray Kids	Won	
K-World Dream Awards	2026	Male Group Popularity Award	Stray Kids	Nominated	
Korea Broadcasting Prizes (Note: The Korea Broadcasting Prizes are hosted annually by the Korean Broadcasters Association since 1973. It has been selecting works and broadcasters that have delivered the public value of terrestrial broadcasting to viewers and contributed to the development of broadcasting. Winners are selected by a panel of 24 judges who are industry experts. Only one award is given to musicians each year.)	2024	Best Singer	Stray Kids	Won	
Korea First Brand Awards (Note: Hosted by the Korea Consumer Brand Committee and the Korea Consumer Forum, the Korea First Brand Awards bases its winners on a nationwide South Korean survey.)	2019	Male Rookie Idol Award	Stray Kids	Won	
Korea First Brand Awards	2021	Hot Trend	Stray Kids	Won	
Korea First Brand Awards	2023	Best Male Idol	Stray Kids	Won	
Korea Grand Music Awards	2024	Best Artist 10	Stray Kids	Nominated	
Korea Grand Music Awards	2024	Best Hip-Hop	Stray Kids	Nominated	
Korea Grand Music Awards	2024	Trend of the Year – K-pop Group	Stray Kids	Nominated	
Korea Grand Music Awards	2024	Best Song 10	"Chk Chk Boom"	Won	
Korea Grand Music Awards	2025	Grand Honor's Choice (Daesang)	Stray Kids	Won	
Korea Grand Music Awards	2025	Grand Record (Daesang)	Stray Kids	Won	
Korea Grand Music Awards	2025	Best Artist 10	Stray Kids	Nominated	
Korea Grand Music Awards	2025	Trend of the Year – K-pop Group	Stray Kids	Nominated	
Korea Grand Music Awards	2025	BIGC Global Star Award	Stray Kids	Nominated	
Korea Grand Music Awards	2025	Best Music 10	Karma	Won	
Korea Grand Music Awards	2025	Best Selling Album	Karma	Won	
Korea Grand Music Awards	2025	Best Music Video	"Ceremony"	Nominated	
Korea Grand Music Awards	2025	Best Dance Performance	"Ceremony"	Nominated	
Korea Grand Music Awards	2025	Best Listener's Pick	"Ceremony"	Nominated	
Korea Grand Music Awards	2025	Best Listener's Pick	"Ceremony" (Hip Hip version; English version)	Nominated	
Korea Grand Music Awards	2026	Best Artist	Stray Kids	Won	
Korea Grand Music Awards	2026	Best Music	"This & That"	Nominated	
Korea Grand Music Awards	2026	Best Music Video	"This & That"	Nominated	
Korea Popular Music Awards (Note: Created in 2018 by the Korea Singers Association, the Korea Entertainment Producer’s Association, the Recording Industry Association of Korea, the Federation of Korean Music Performers, and the Korea Music Copyright Association, the Korea Popular Music Awards is designed to honor leaders in the hallyu wave.)	2018	Popularity Award	Stray Kids	Nominated	
Korea Popular Music Awards	2018	Rookie of the Year	Stray Kids	Nominated	
Korean Brand of the Year Awards (Note: The Korean Brand of the Year Awards selects the biggest brands from a large collection of categories via online voting.)	2018	Male Rookie Idol of the Year	Stray Kids	Nominated	
Korean Brand of the Year Awards	2020	Male Idol of the Year (Rising Star)	Stray Kids	Nominated	
Korean Brand of the Year Awards	2021	Male Idol of the Year (Hot Trend)	Stray Kids	Nominated	
Korean Brand of the Year Awards	2022	Male Idol of the Year	Stray Kids	Nominated	
Korean Brand of the Year Awards	2023	Male Idol of the Year	Stray Kids	Nominated	
Korean Brand of the Year Awards	2025	Male Idol of the Year	Stray Kids	Won	
MAMA Awards	2018	Artist of the Year	Stray Kids	Nominated	
MAMA Awards	2018	Best New Male Artist	Stray Kids	Won	
MAMA Awards	2018	Mwave Global Fan's Choice	"My Pace"	Nominated	
MAMA Awards	2021	TikTok Artist of the Year	Stray Kids	Nominated	
MAMA Awards	2021	Best Male Group	Stray Kids	Nominated	
MAMA Awards	2021	TikTok Song of the Year	"Thunderous"	Nominated	
MAMA Awards	2021	Best Dance Performance – Male Group	"Thunderous"	Nominated	
MAMA Awards	2021	TikTok Favorite Moment	Stray Kids	Nominated	
MAMA Awards	2021	Worldwide Fans' Choice Top 10	Stray Kids	Won	
MAMA Awards	2021	Worldwide Icon of the Year	Stray Kids	Nominated	
MAMA Awards	2022	Yogibo Artist of the Year	Stray Kids	Nominated	
MAMA Awards	2022	Best Male Group	Stray Kids	Nominated	
MAMA Awards	2022	Worldwide Fans' Choice Top 10	Stray Kids	Won	
MAMA Awards	2022	Worldwide Icon of the Year	Stray Kids	Nominated	
MAMA Awards	2022	Yogibo Chill Artist	Stray Kids	Won	
MAMA Awards	2022	Most Popular Group	Stray Kids	Won	
MAMA Awards	2022	Yogibo Album of the Year	Maxident	Nominated	
MAMA Awards	2022	Yogibo Song of the Year	"Maniac"	Nominated	
MAMA Awards	2022	Best Dance Performance – Male Group	"Maniac"	Nominated	
MAMA Awards	2023	Samsung Galaxy Artist of the Year	Stray Kids	Nominated	
MAMA Awards	2023	Best Male Group	Stray Kids	Nominated	
MAMA Awards	2023	Samsung Galaxy Worldwide Icon of the Year	Stray Kids	Nominated	
MAMA Awards	2023	Worldwide Fans' Choice	Stray Kids	Won	
MAMA Awards	2023	Samsung Galaxy Album of the Year	5-Star	Nominated	
MAMA Awards	2023	Samsung Galaxy Song of the Year	"S-Class"	Nominated	
MAMA Awards	2023	Best Dance Performance – Male Group	"S-Class"	Nominated	
MAMA Awards	2023	Best Music Video	"S-Class"	Nominated	
MAMA Awards	2024	Visa Artist of the Year	Stray Kids	Nominated	
MAMA Awards	2024	Best Male Group	Stray Kids	Nominated	
MAMA Awards	2024	Visa Fans' Choice of the Year	Stray Kids	Nominated	
MAMA Awards	2024	Fans' Choice Top 10 – Male	Stray Kids	Won	
MAMA Awards	2024	Visa Album of the Year	Rock-Star	Nominated	
MAMA Awards	2024	Visa Song of the Year	"Lalalala"	Nominated	
MAMA Awards	2024	Best Dance Performance – Male Group	"Lalalala"	Nominated	
MAMA Awards	2025	Visa Artist of the Year	Stray Kids	Nominated	
MAMA Awards	2025	Best Male Group	Stray Kids	Nominated	
MAMA Awards	2025	Visa Fans' Choice of the Year	Stray Kids	Nominated	
MAMA Awards	2025	Fans' Choice Top 10 – Male	Stray Kids	Won	
MAMA Awards	2025	Visa Super Stage Artist	Stray Kids	Nominated	
MAMA Awards	2025	Visa Album of the Year	Karma	Won	
MAMA Awards	2026	Fans' Choice – Male	Stray Kids	Won	
MAMA Awards	2026	Best Male Group	Stray Kids	Nominated	
MAMA Awards	2026	Album of the Year	This & That	Nominated	
MAMA Awards	2026	Best Dance Performance – Male Group	"This & That"	Nominated	
Melon Music Awards	2018	Best New Male Artist	Stray Kids	Nominated	
Melon Music Awards	2023	Millions Top 10	5-Star	Nominated	
Melon Music Awards	2024	Millions Top 10	Rock-Star	Nominated	
Melon Music Awards	2025	Berriz Global Fan's Choice	Stray Kids	Nominated	
Melon Music Awards	2026	Global Top 10	Stray Kids	Nominated	
Mnet Japan Fan's Choice Awards	2022	Artist of the Year	Stray Kids	Won	
MTV Europe Music Awards	2020	Best Korean Act	Stray Kids	Won	
MTV Europe Music Awards	2023	Best K-Pop	Stray Kids	Nominated	
MTV Europe Music Awards	2024	Best K-Pop	Stray Kids	Nominated	
MTV Video Music Awards	2022	Best K-Pop	"Maniac"	Nominated	
MTV Video Music Awards	2023	Best K-Pop	"S-Class"	Won	
MTV Video Music Awards	2024	Best K-Pop	"Lalalala"	Nominated	
MTV Video Music Awards	2025	Best K-Pop	"Chk Chk Boom"	Nominated	
MTV Video Music Awards	2025	Best Group	Stray Kids	Nominated	
MTV Video Music Awards Japan	2023	Best Group Video – International	"Case 143"	Won	
Music Awards Japan	2026	Best K-pop Artist	Stray Kids	Nominated	
Nickelodeon Kids' Choice Awards	2025	Favorite Music Group	Stray Kids	Won	
Nickelodeon Kids' Choice Awards	2025	Favorite Global Music Star	Stray Kids	Nominated	
Nickelodeon Mexico Kids' Choice Awards	2023	Favorite K-Pop Group	Stray Kids	Won	
People's Choice Awards	2024	Group/Duo of the Year	Stray Kids	Won	
Seoul Music Awards	2019	Rookie of the Year	Stray Kids	Won	
Seoul Music Awards	2019	Popularity Award	Stray Kids	Nominated	
Seoul Music Awards	2019	Hallyu Special Award	Stray Kids	Nominated	
Seoul Music Awards	2020	Main Award (Bonsang)	Stray Kids	Nominated	
Seoul Music Awards	2020	Popularity Award	Stray Kids	Nominated	
Seoul Music Awards	2020	K-Wave Award	Stray Kids	Nominated	
Seoul Music Awards	2020	QQ Music Most Popular K-Pop Artist Award	Stray Kids	Nominated	
Seoul Music Awards	2021	Main Award (Bonsang)	Stray Kids	Won	
Seoul Music Awards	2021	Grand Award (Daesang)	Stray Kids	Nominated	
Seoul Music Awards	2021	Popularity Award	Stray Kids	Nominated	
Seoul Music Awards	2021	K-Wave Popularity Award	Stray Kids	Nominated	
Seoul Music Awards	2021	Legend Rookie Prize	Stray Kids	Nominated	
Seoul Music Awards	2021	Whosfandom Award	Stray Kids	Nominated	
Seoul Music Awards	2022	Main Award (Bonsang)	Stray Kids	Nominated	
Seoul Music Awards	2022	Popularity Award	Stray Kids	Nominated	
Seoul Music Awards	2022	K-Wave Popularity Award	Stray Kids	Nominated	
Seoul Music Awards	2022	U+Idol Live Best Artist Award	Stray Kids	Nominated	
Seoul Music Awards	2023	Main Award (Bonsang)	Stray Kids	Won	
Seoul Music Awards	2023	Grand Award (Daesang)	Stray Kids	Nominated	
Seoul Music Awards	2023	Popularity Award	Stray Kids	Nominated	
Seoul Music Awards	2023	K-Wave Award	Stray Kids	Nominated	
Seoul Music Awards	2024	Main Award (Bonsang)	Stray Kids	Won	
Seoul Music Awards	2024	Grand Award (Daesang)	Stray Kids	Nominated	
Seoul Music Awards	2024	Popularity Award	Stray Kids	Nominated	
Seoul Music Awards	2024	Hallyu Special Award	Stray Kids	Nominated	
Seoul Music Awards	2025	Main Award (Bonsang)	Stray Kids	Won	
Seoul Music Awards	2025	Grand Award (Daesang)	Stray Kids	Nominated	
Seoul Music Awards	2025	Popularity Award	Stray Kids	Nominated	
Seoul Music Awards	2025	K-Wave Special Award	Stray Kids	Nominated	
Seoul Music Awards	2025	K-pop World Choice – Group	Stray Kids	Nominated	
Seoul Music Awards	2026	The Best Award (Bonsang)	Stray Kids	Nominated	
Seoul Music Awards	2026	The Popularity Award	Stray Kids	Nominated	
Seoul Music Awards	2026	Korea Wave Award	Stray Kids	Nominated	
Seoul Music Awards	2026	The R&B Hiphop Award	Stray Kids	Nominated	
Seoul Music Awards	2026	K-pop World Choice – Group	Stray Kids	Nominated	
Short Shorts Film Festival & Asia	2024	Global Spotlight Award	SKZflix	Won	
Soompi Awards	2019	Breakout Artist	Stray Kids	Nominated	
Soompi Awards	2019	Rookie of the Year	Stray Kids	Won	
Soribada Best K-Music Awards			Stray Kids		
Soribada Best K-Music Awards	2018	New Hallyu Rookie Award	Stray Kids	Won	
Soribada Best K-Music Awards	2019	Rising Hot Star Award	Stray Kids	Won	
Soribada Best K-Music Awards	2020	Global Hot Trend Award	Stray Kids	Won	
Space Shower Music Awards	2021	People's Choice	Stray Kids	Nominated	
TMELive International Music Awards	2026	International Group of the Year	Stray Kids	Won	
TMELive International Music Awards	2026	Global Trend Songs Top 10	"Do It"	Won	
V Live Awards	2019	Global Artist Top 12	Stray Kids	Won	
V Live Awards	2019	Global Rookie Top 5	Stray Kids	Won	
Visionary Awards (Note: Visionary Awards, which started in 2020, selects and awards people who lead roles in the Korean entertainment industry. It highlights the meaning and achievements of a person whose chosen trend keywords penetrated the entertainment industry, including broadcasting, movies, music, and performances, and presents the next vision of the cultural sector with outstanding achievements and influence.)	2024	2024 Visionary	Stray Kids	Won	

== Other accolades ==
=== State and cultural honors ===
Name of country, year given, and name of honor
Country	Year	Honor	Ref.
South Korea (Note: Honors are given at the Korean Popular Culture and Arts Awards, arranged by the Korea Creative Content Agency and hosted by the Ministry of Culture, Sports and Tourism. They are awarded to those who have contributed to the arts and South Korea's pop culture.)	2023	Prime Minister's Commendation	

=== Listicles ===
Name of publisher, year listed, name of listicle, and placement result
Publisher	Year	Listicle	Result	Ref.
Billboard	2018	10 Best New K-Pop Acts of 2018	2nd	
Forbes Asia	2025	30 Under 30 Asia (Entertainment & Sports)	Placed	
Forbes Korea	2024	30 Under 30 (Entertainment)	Placed	
Forbes Korea	2025	Korean Idols of the Year	3rd	
Gold House	2024	A100 List	Placed	
The Hollywood Reporter	2024	25 Stars Who Are Setting the Culture Afire	Placed	
Luminate	2025	Most Streamed K-Pop Artist in US	3rd	
Rolling Stone Korea	2025	Musician of 2025	Placed	
TikTok	2025	Top 10 Artists Globally	Placed	
Time	2023	Next Generation Leaders	Placed	
