= Slash (song) =

Promotional single by Stray Kids

from the album Deadpool & Wolverine (Original Motion Picture Soundtrack)
- Language: Korean; English
- Released: July 23, 2024
- Studio: JYPE (Seoul); Channie's "Room" (Seoul)
- Genre: EDM trap
- Length: 3:11
- Label: JYP; Republic
- Composers: Bang Chan; Changbin; Han; Versachoi
- Lyricists: Bang Chan; Changbin; Han

"Slash" is a song by South Korean boy band Stray Kids from the soundtrack to the 2024 Marvel Studios superhero film Deadpool & Wolverine. It was released as a promotional single on July 23, 2024, through JYP Entertainment and Republic Records.

== Background and release ==
In 2021, Stray Kids competed the competition show Kingdom: Legendary War. In the second part of the third round, the group performed the mashup of their song "God's Menu" and Blackpink's "Ddu-Du Ddu-Du" with the theme heavily inspired by the film Deadpool (2016). They used various properties inspired by the film such as Deadpool's mask and Ant-Man's tanks. This performance was noticed by Deadpool actor Ryan Reynolds, who mentioned them in a fan edit video of Deadpool and the show on Twitter and following their social media accounts, then Wolverine actor Hugh Jackman also noticed and followed. Reynolds sent his signed Aviation American Gin along with Deadpool mask to Stray Kids, and the group's Bang Chan sent Reynolds the signed In Life (2020) album back. During the promotion of Free Guy (2021), Reynolds did a video interview with Bang Chan and expressed their thankful feelings to each other.

During Deadpool & Wolverine press conference in Seoul, South Korea, Reynolds mentioned his interest in K-pop by mentioning Stray Kids. After the press conference, Reynolds and Jackman were reported to have a private meeting with Stray Kids' Bang Chan, Felix, and Han, and prepared a special content for the film. On July 17, 2024, the track list for the Deadpool & Wolverine soundtrack was revealed, which features "Slash" by Stray Kids as the fourth track. The song was released as a promotional single ahead of the soundtrack album on July 23, 2024.

== Composition ==
"Slash" is described as an EDM trap song, combining "strong drum beats and restrained synth sounds," with an "addictive piano line and 'Knife FX' sound added to the majestic yet tense atmosphere." It was written by the group's in-house producer 3Racha (Bang Chan, Changbin, and Han), and co-composed with Versachoi.

== Commercial performance ==
In South Korea, "Slash" debuted at number 24 on the Circle Download Chart, and number 151 on the BGM Chart. In Japan, the song debuted at number 13 on Billboard Japan Download Songs, and number 12 on Oricon Digital Singles Chart. In the United Kingdom, the song debuted at number 75 on Official Charts Company's Singles Sales Chart, and number 68 on the Singles Download Chart. The song also entered the US Billboard World Digital Song Sales at number 5.

== Live performances ==
Stray Kids performed "Slash" live for the first time at their 2026 Run It World Tour.

== Accolades ==
List of awards and nominations received by "Slash"
Ceremony	Year	Category	Result	Ref.
Asian Pop Music Awards	2024	Best OST (Overseas)	Nominated	

== Credits and personnel ==
Personnel

- Stray Kids – lead vocals
  - Bang Chan (3Racha) – background vocals, lyrics, composition, arrangement, instruments, computer programming, digital editing, recording
  - Changbin (3Racha) – background vocals, lyrics, composition
  - Han (3Racha) – background vocals, lyrics, composition
- Versachoi – composition, arrangement, instruments, computer programming
- Lee Kyeong-won – digital editing
- Lim Chan-mi – recording
- Yoon Won-kwon – mixing
- Kwon Nam-woo – mastering

Locations

- JYPE Studios – recording
- Channie's "Room" – recording
- MadMiix – mixing
- 821 Sound Mastering – mastering

== Charts ==
Chart performance for "Slash"
Chart (2024)	Peak position
Japan Download (Billboard Japan)	13
Japan Digital Singles (Oricon)	12
South Korea BGM (Circle)	151
South Korea Download (Circle)	24
UK Singles Downloads (Official Charts)	68
UK Singles Sales (OCC)	75
US World Digital Song Sales (Billboard)	5

== Release history ==
Release dates and formats for "Slash"
Region	Date	Format	Label	Ref.
Various	July 23, 2024	Digital download; streaming	JYP; Republic	
