= Stray Kids =

South Korean boy band

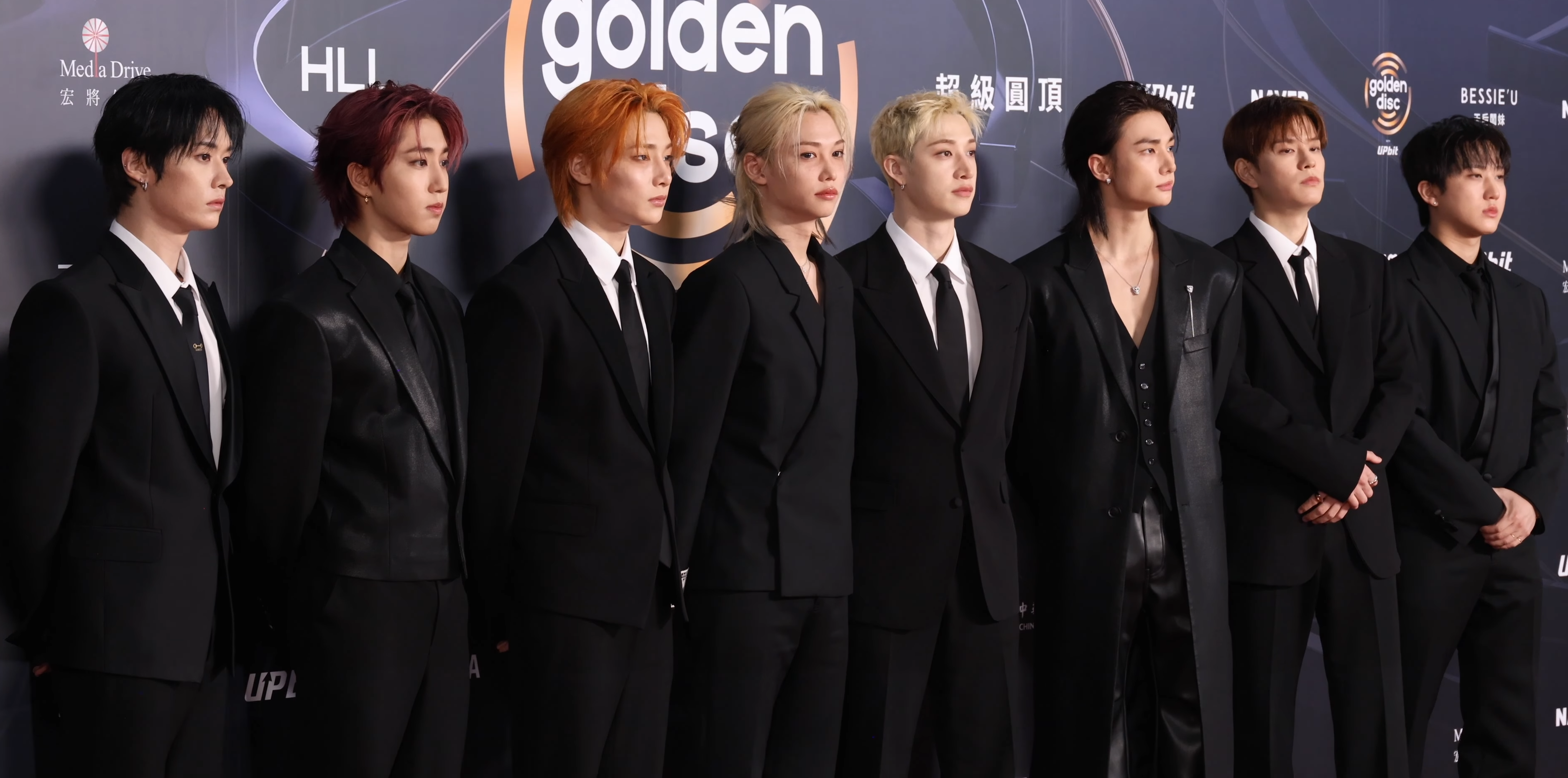
- Stray Kids in January 2026; From left to right: Lee Know, Han, I.N, Felix, Bang Chan, Hyunjin, Seungmin, and Changbin

Background information
- Origin: Seoul, South Korea
- Genres: K-pop; hip-hop; electronic
- Works: Discography; songs; videography; performances
- Years active: 2017–present
- Labels: JYP; Epic Japan; Republic
- Spinoffs: 3Racha
- Awards: Full list
- Members: Bang Chan; Lee Know; Changbin; Hyunjin; Han; Felix; Seungmin; I.N
- Past members: Woojin
- Website: straykids.jype.com

Stray Kids (often abbreviated to SKZ; Korean: 스트레이 키즈; RR: Seuteurei Kijeu) is a South Korean boy band formed by JYP Entertainment in 2017. The band has eight members: Bang Chan, Lee Know, Changbin, Hyunjin, Han, Felix, Seungmin, and I.N. Former member Woojin left the band in 2019. Stray Kids primarily self-produces its recordings; the main production team is 3Racha, consisting of Bang Chan, Changbin, and Han, with the other members frequently participating in songwriting.

The leader, Bang Chan, personally selected each member to be a part of the band before filming the eponymous 2017 reality television show. The band released their unofficial debut extended play (EP) Mixtape in January 2018 and officially debuted on March 25 with the EP I Am Not, which was followed by the EPs I Am Who and I Am You, completing the I Am EP series. The Clé trilogy, consisting of Clé 1: Miroh, Clé 2: Yellow Wood, and Clé: Levanter, was released in 2019.

Stray Kids made their Japanese debut in 2020 with the compilation album SKZ2020, which was released through Epic Records Japan. Their debut Japanese single, "Top", debuted atop the Oricon Singles Chart, making them the fourth foreign male artist to do so with their first single. The band's first studio album, Go Live (2020), became its first platinum-certified album by the Korea Music Content Association (KMCA). Its lead single, "God's Menu", is regarded as the group's signature track. In 2021, Stray Kids's second studio album, Noeasy, was the group's first million-selling album.

After signing with Republic Records for promotions in the United States in 2022, Stray Kids's subsequent releases–Oddinary, Maxident (both 2022), 5-Star, Rock-Star (both 2023), Ate, Hop (both 2024), Karma, Do It (both 2025), and This & That (2026)–debuted atop the Billboard 200, making them the first act to debut at the top of the chart with their first nine entries. The KMCA certified the band's 5-Star for selling 5 million albums, the third group to achieve this in South Korea. As of May 2026, Stray Kids has sold over 40 million albums, both Korean and Japanese releases. Rock-Star's lead single "Lalalala" became their first entry on the Billboard Hot 100. The band's Japanese EP Social Path / Super Bowl (Japanese Ver.) (2023) was their first million certification in Japan.

Stray Kids appeared on Time's list of Next Generation Leaders in 2023, and the Entertainment and Sports category of Forbes Asia's 30 Under 30 in 2025. They also received South Korea's Prime Minister's Commendation for their contributions to South Korea's pop culture. The band accolades include multiple Asia Artist Awards, Billboard Music Awards, Circle Chart Music Awards, The Fact Music Awards, Golden Disc Awards, Hanteo Music Awards, iHeartRadio Music Awards, Japan Gold Disc Awards, Korea Grand Music Awards, MAMA Awards, Seoul Music Awards, etc.

== History ==
=== 2017–2018: Formation, debut and I Am series ===
In August 2017, JYP Entertainment (JYPE) announced its new reality survival show to launch a male idol debut project. The company released more details in the next two months, including the show's title, Stray Kids. Prior to its premiere on October 17, JYPE released Stray Kids's first music video titled "Hellevator", which was later released as a digital single. Two members, Lee Know and Felix, were eliminated but returned in the final, nine-member line-up. It was later revealed that the Stray Kids's member line-up was formed unusually, with the leader Bang Chan handpicking each member from the list of JYPE trainees rather than the agency's executives and creative directors selecting them. The band's members themselves conceptualized the name "Stray Kids" and created their own logo. The name originally referred to a lost child who wants to chase their dreams, then evolved to represent the idea of finding a way out of the ordinary together.

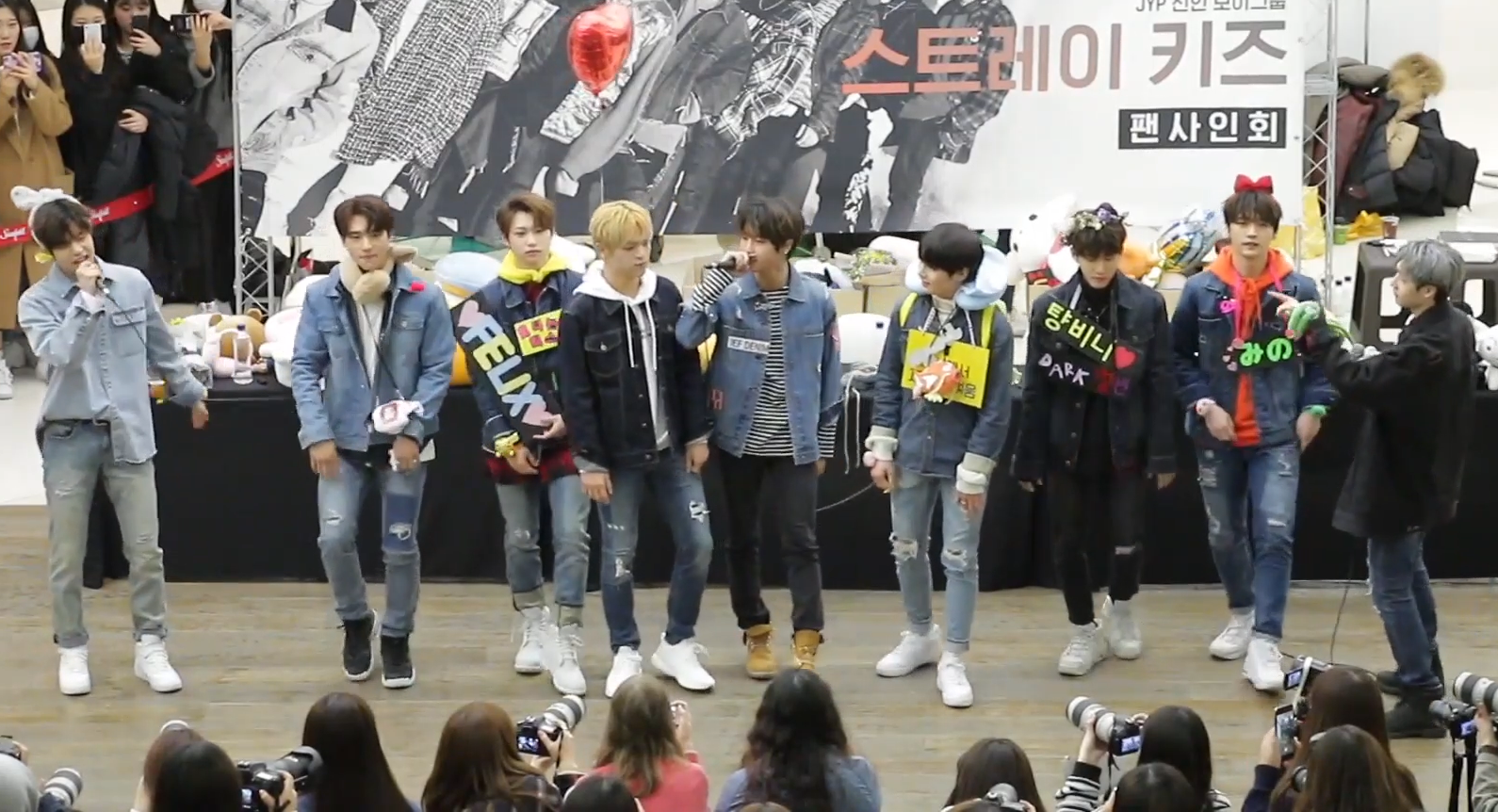
Stray Kids at a fan event in the COEX Live Plaza in January 2018.

Along with the launch of Stray Kids's official website, JYPE announced the release of the group's seven-track pre-debut extended play (EP) titled Mixtape, which was co-written and co-composed by the members and includes "Hellevator" and other songs the band performed on the show. The EP and the performance video of its second track, "Beware", were released on January 8, 2018, while "Spread My Wings" was uploaded online a week later. The EP debuted at number two on the Gaon Album Chart and the Billboard World Albums chart.

On March 25, the group held their debut concert, Stray Kids Unveil (Op. 01: I Am Not), at Jangchung Arena. The following day, the band officially debuted with the release of the EP I Am Not and the music video of its title track, "District 9". The music video of "Grow Up" and the "Mirror" performance video were released on March 31 and April 23, respectively. I Am Not debuted at number four on the Gaon Album Chart and sold over 54,000 physical copies in March.

On April 14, Stray Kids performed at KCON Japan 2018, the group's first overseas performance. On July 12, JYPE announced the group's second concert, Stray Kids Unveil (Op. 02: I Am Who), for August 5 at Kyung Hee University's Grand Peace Palace. The following day, the band's second EP, I Am Who, and its lead single, "My Pace", were released. On October 4, JYPE announced the group's third concert, Stray Kids Unveil (Op. 03: I Am You), for October 21 at Olympic Hall. The band's new EP, I Am You, was released the following day.

=== 2019: Clé series and Woojin's departure ===
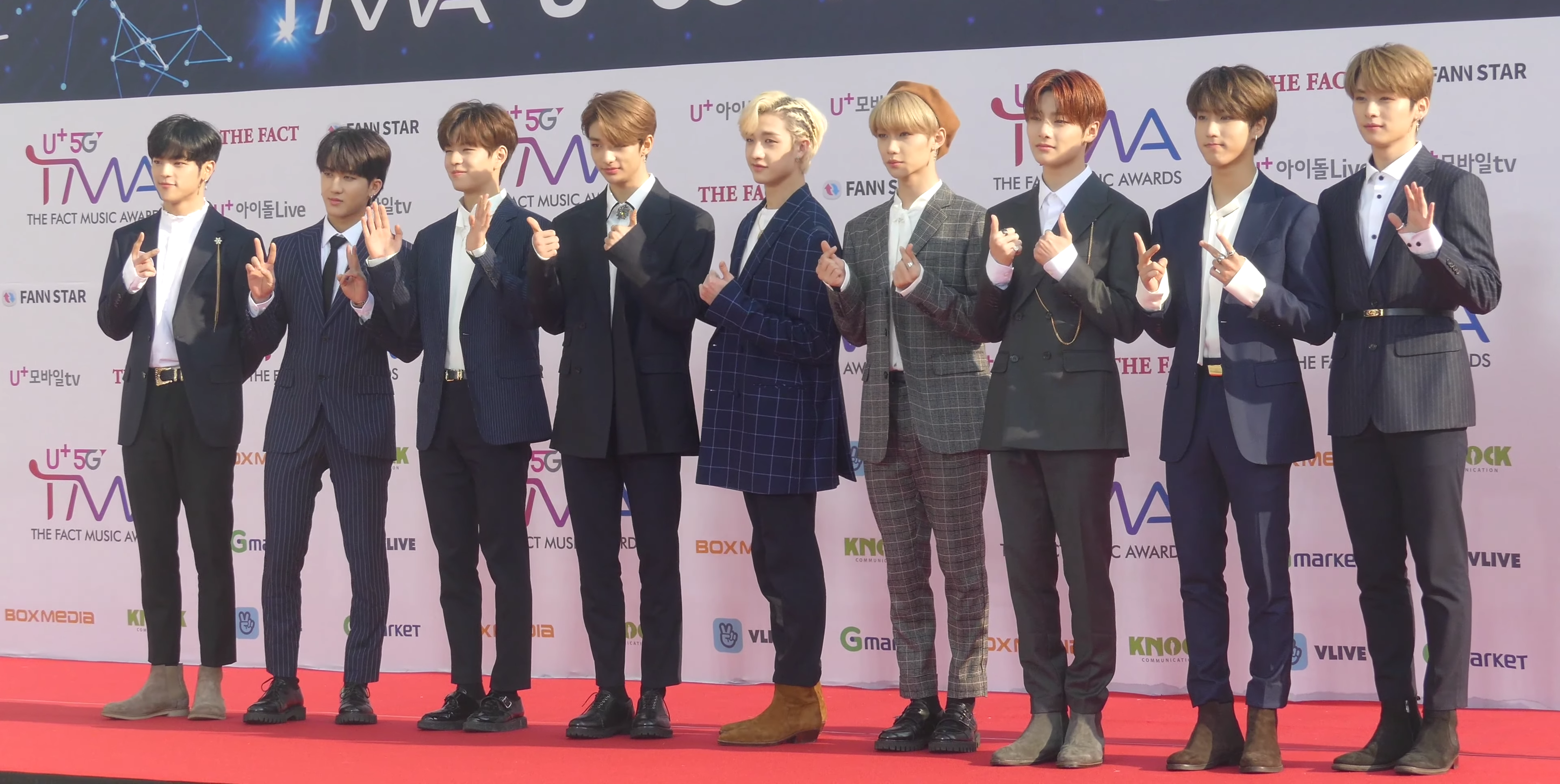
Stray Kids at the red carpet of TMA in April 2019.

In early 2019, Stray Kids toured the Asia-Pacific region on their concert tour Unveil Tour "I Am...", starting on January 19 in Bangkok, Thailand. The group also toured South Korea with the Hi Stay Tour, performing in cities including Busan, Daejeon, and Incheon in March, and a finale at the Olympic Park in Seoul on April 20. On March 5, JYPE announced the release of the band's fourth EP, Clé 1: Miroh, to mark the first anniversary of the group's debut. On April 14, the group earned their first music-show win on M Countdown for the album's lead single, "Miroh". On June 19, the band released its first special album, Clé 2: Yellow Wood, and its lead single, "Side Effects", between the American and European legs of its first world tour.

Stray Kids released a digital single titled "Double Knot" on October 9, 2019, and announced the District 9 Unlock World Tour, beginning at Olympic Hall in Seoul from November 23 to 24. Their fifth EP, Clé: Levanter, was initially scheduled for a November 25 release, but on October 28, JYPE announced Kim Woojin had left the group due to personal circumstances, and the release was postponed. On November 13, the group released the music video for "Astronaut", its first single as an eight-member group; it was followed on December 9 by Cle: Levanter. On December 19, as part of the Hi Stay Tour, Stray Kids performed at Yoyogi National Gymnasium, Tokyo, with an audience of 8,000 people. The group released the digital single "Mixtape: Gone Days", the first single of the Mixtape Project, on December 26.

=== 2020: Japanese debut, 生 series, and All In ===
Stray Kids released its first English versions of "Double Knot" and "Levanter" as digital singles—together titled Step Out of Clé—and a performance video of the English version of "Double Knot" on January 24, 2020. The band's debut release in Japan, through Epic Records Japan, was the compilation album SKZ2020, which contains new recordings of previous songs, as well as Japanese versions of "My Pace", "Double Knot", and "Levanter". The group released the second Mixtape Project digital single, "Mixtape: On Track", on March 26. On June 3, Stray Kids released its first Japanese single, "Top", and its B-side, "Slump"; these were used as the theme song and the ending theme for the anime Kami no Tō: Tower of God, respectively. A Korean version was released on May 13, and an English version was released on May 20. The single debuted at number one on the Japanese Oricon Singles Chart, making Stray Kids the fourth foreign male artists to debut at number one on the chart with their first single, after Jang Keun-suk, Exo, and iKon.

On June 17, Stray Kids released their first studio album, Go Live, and its lead single, "God's Menu"; the album includes the Korean versions of "Top" and "Slump" and previously released singles "Gone Days" and "On Track". Go Live became the group's best-selling album at the time, debuting at number one on the weekly Gaon Album Chart, selling 243,462 copies by the end of the month, and peaking at number five on the monthly Gaon Album Chart. The Korea Music Content Association (KMCA) certified the album platinum in August 2020, the group's first album to achieve this. "God's Menu" became the group's first single to be certified gold and platinum by the Recording Industry Association of America (RIAA). On September 14, Stray Kids reissued its first studio album as In Life. During promotions, the group received music-show wins on MBC M's Show Champion and Mnet's M Countdown. Time ranked the lead single "Back Door" eighth on its list of the 10 Best Songs of 2020—the only song by a Korean act on the list—and described it as "an artful Frankenstein that's as catchy as it is complex".

Stray Kids's first Japanese EP, All In, with the title track "All In" as the lead single, was released on November 4. The EP also includes Japanese versions of "God's Menu" and "Back Door", as well as the band's first Japanese single, "Top." On November 22, the group held their first online concert, titled "Unlock: Go Live In Life", via Beyond Live, which was considered a continuation of their "District 9: Unlock" Tour that faced postponement and cancellation due to concerns over the COVID-19 pandemic. During the concert, the group performed the Korean version of their song "All In" for the first time, which was released as a digital single on November 26.

=== 2021: Kingdom: Legendary War and Noeasy ===
At the 2020 Mnet Asian Music Awards, it was announced that Stray Kids would join Ateez and the Boyz on the inaugural season of Kingdom: Legendary War, an Mnet boy-group competition show; BtoB, iKon, and SF9 were later also confirmed as participants. On May 28, 2021, Stray Kids released a song titled "Wolfgang" for the final round of the competition, which charted at number 138 on the main Gaon Digital Chart, the band's first appearance on that chart. The band won the program on June 3, earning them their own reality show and a Kingdom Week special show.

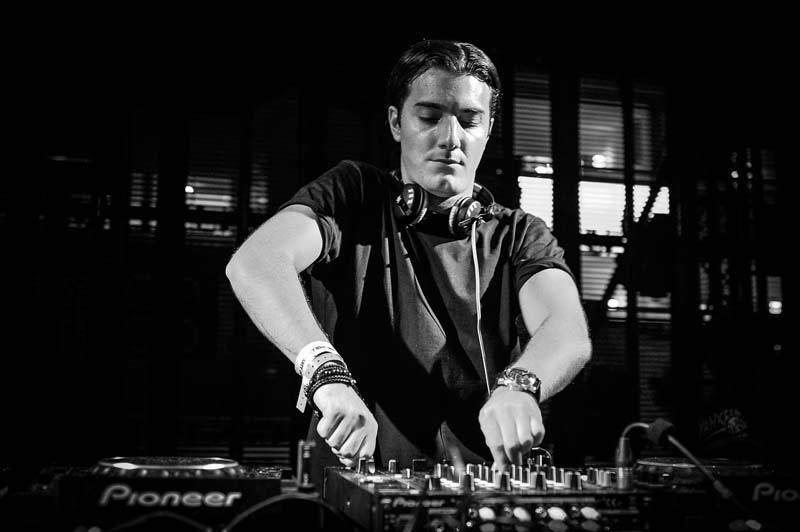
Stray Kids collaborated with Alesso (pictured) and Corsak in "Going Dumb".

Stray Kids held its first official fan meeting, Stray Kids 1st #LoveStay 'SKZ-X', on February 20, 2021, via V Live, and its first Japanese fan meeting—STAYing Home Meeting—for the first anniversary of their Japanese debut on March 18. The group worked with Swedish producer Alesso and Chinese DJ Corsak on the Korean version of the song "Going Dumb" for PUBG Mobile, which was released on March 19. The song debuted at number 13 on Billboard's Hot Dance/Electronic Songs, the group's first appearance on that chart.

Stray Kids unexpectedly released the third single for their Mixtape Project, "Mixtape: Oh", on June 26 without any prior announcement. It debuted at number one on the Billboard World Digital Song Sales chart, their first number one on that chart. The group released their second studio album, Noeasy, on August 23, 2021. It debuted at number one on the Gaon Album Chart, selling over 1.1 million copies as of August 2021 and being certified million by the KMCA, making Stray Kids the first JYPE act to sell more than one million copies of an album. The album's lead single, "Thunderous", peaked at number 33 on the Gaon Digital Chart and at number 80 on the Billboard Global 200, earning six wins on South Korean music programs. The accompanying music video on YouTube reached 100 million views in 55 days after release, the group's fifth and fastest video to reach this mark.

The group released its second Japanese single, "Scars"/"Thunderous (Japanese ver.)", on October 13. The single charted at number two on the Oricon Singles Chart and the Billboard Japan Hot 100, selling over 180,000 CD copies. A Christmas-themed "special holiday" album titled Christmas EveL was released on November 29, including the title track and "Winter Falls" as lead singles. It peaked atop the Gaon Album Chart, selling over 743,000 copies in 2021, and the KMCA certified it double platinum. Stray Kids concluded the year with the digital release of SKZ2021, a compilation album that includes re-recorded versions of earlier songs and the Korean version of "Scars", on December 23.

=== 2022: Oddinary, Circus, and Maxident ===
On February 10, 2022, it was announced that Stray Kids, alongside labelmate Itzy, had signed to Republic Records for promotions in the United States as part of JYPE's strategic partnership with the label. The group held their second fan meeting on February 12 and 13 at Olympic Hall; the second day was broadcast via Beyond Live. Stray Kids released its sixth EP, Oddinary, on March 18. The EP peaked at number one on charts in South Korea, Finland, Poland, and the United States, selling over 1.5 million copies in March. It was the first Stray Kids album to appear on the UK Albums Chart and the US Billboard 200; the band was the third Korean act to top the latter chart after BTS and SuperM. Its lead single, "Maniac", became the group's first song to appear on the UK Singles Chart, where it charted at number 98, and the Bubbling Under Hot 100 at number 19, among others.

In support of Oddinary, Stray Kids announced their second concert tour, the Maniac World Tour, which began on April 29 in Seoul, South Korea, followed by shows in Asia, Australia, and North America. It concluded in Los Angeles on April 2, 2023. On June 22, Stray Kids released their second Japanese EP, Circus, preceded by the Japanese version of "Maniac", the new song "Your Eyes", and the title track. The EP debuted at number two on the Oricon Albums Chart and atop Billboard Japan Hot Albums. The group surprise-released the single "Mixtape: Time Out" on August 1 to celebrate their fourth anniversary of revealing the fandom's name, Stay.

Prior to the release of the group's seventh EP, Maxident, Stray Kids released "Heyday", which 3Racha performed for Street Man Fighter's Mega Crew Mission. Maxident and the EP's lead single, "Case 143", were released on October 7, 2022. The EP debuted at number one in South Korea, Poland, and the United States. It became their second consecutive number-one album in the US and the fourth South Korean and non-English album to top the Billboard 200 chart. Maxident became Stray Kids's and JYPE's first album to sell over two million and three million copies and be certified triple million by KMCA. They released the third compilation album, SKZ-Replay, on December 21, containing solo tracks by the members and songs previously unofficially released as video uploads. The International Federation of the Phonographic Industry (IFPI) ranked Stray Kids as the seventh-best-selling artist of 2022. Maxident and Oddinary were the sixth-best- and fourteenth-best-selling albums of 2022.

=== 2023: The Sound, 5-Star, Social Path / Super Bowl (Japanese Ver.), and Rock-Star ===
Stray Kids's debut Japanese-language studio album titled The Sound was released on February 22, 2023; this release was preceded by the Japanese version of "Case 143" and the title track. It debuted at number one on the Oricon Albums Chart for the first time with 378,000 copies, and the Recording Industry Association of Japan (RIAJ) certified it double platinum. On June 2, 2023, the group released its third studio album, 5-Star, and the lead single "S-Class"; rapper Tiger JK features on the side track "Topline". The album's lyrics discuss themes of uniqueness, confidence, and aspirations. The album peaked at number one in various regions, including South Korea, France, and the United States; the latter is the group's third consecutive number-one album in the country. It has sold over five million copies as of June 2023, and KMCA certified it as such. "S-Class" won the Best K-Pop Video at the 2023 MTV Video Music Awards.

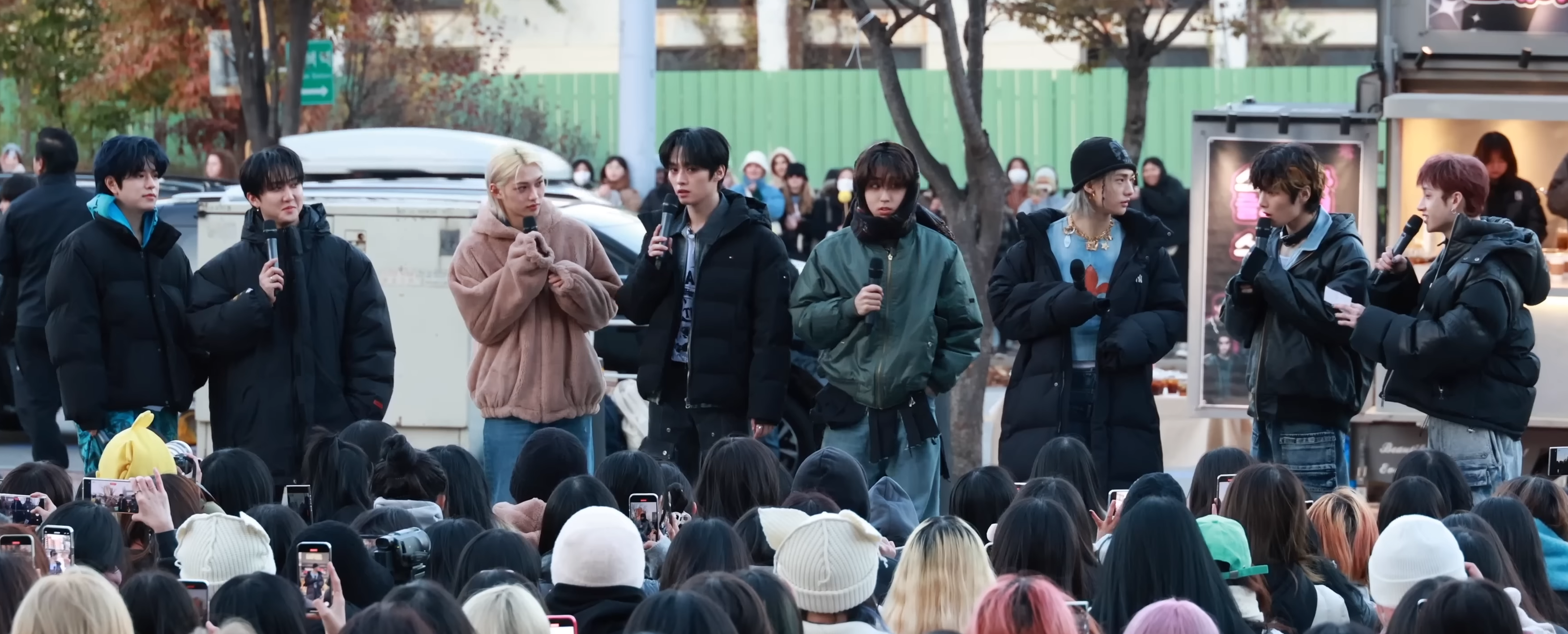
Stray Kids's mini fan meeting in November 2023.

Stray Kids held the band's third fan meeting at KSPO Dome on July 1 and 2 and embarked on the 5-Star Dome Tour in South Korea and Japan from August to October 2023. The group headlined the Lollapalooza music festival in Paris, France, on July 21 and was scheduled to appear at the 2023 Global Citizen Festival in New York City on September 23. However, due to a minor car accident involving three of the band's members, only 3Racha performed instead. The group's third Japanese-language EP, Social Path / Super Bowl (Japanese Ver.), was released on September 6; the release was preceded by dual lead singles "Social Path" featuring Japanese singer-songwriter Lisa and the Japanese version of "Super Bowl". The EP became the band's second number one in Japan and its first million-certified record in Japan.

In October, Stray Kids featured on one of the remix versions of Lil Durk's "All My Life" and released their eighth Korean-language EP, Rock-Star, on November 10, alongside the lead single "Lalalala". The EP peaked at number one in South Korea and the United States, and "Lalalala" became the group's first entry on the US Billboard Hot 100 at number 90. Furthermore, in 2023, Stray Kids received the Prime Minister's Commendation at the Korean Popular Culture and Arts Awards and participated in the Japanese New Year's Eve television special 74th NHK Kōhaku Uta Gassen. IFPI named Stray Kids the third best-selling artist of 2023, behind Taylor Swift and Seventeen, with 5-Star as the second and Rock-Star as the ninth best-selling album globally in 2023.

=== 2024: Ate, Giant, and Hop ===
In January 2024, Stray Kids performed "God's Menu", "S-Class", and "Topline" in Paris, France, at the Le Gala des Pièces Jaunes, a charity event organized by Brigitte Macron, the spouse of Emmanuel Macron, the President of France. The following month, the group, alongside other JYP artists J.Y. Park, Itzy, and Nmixx, collaborated with Coca-Cola for a "K-Wave" limited edition of Coke Zero Sugar, accompanied by the song "Like Magic".

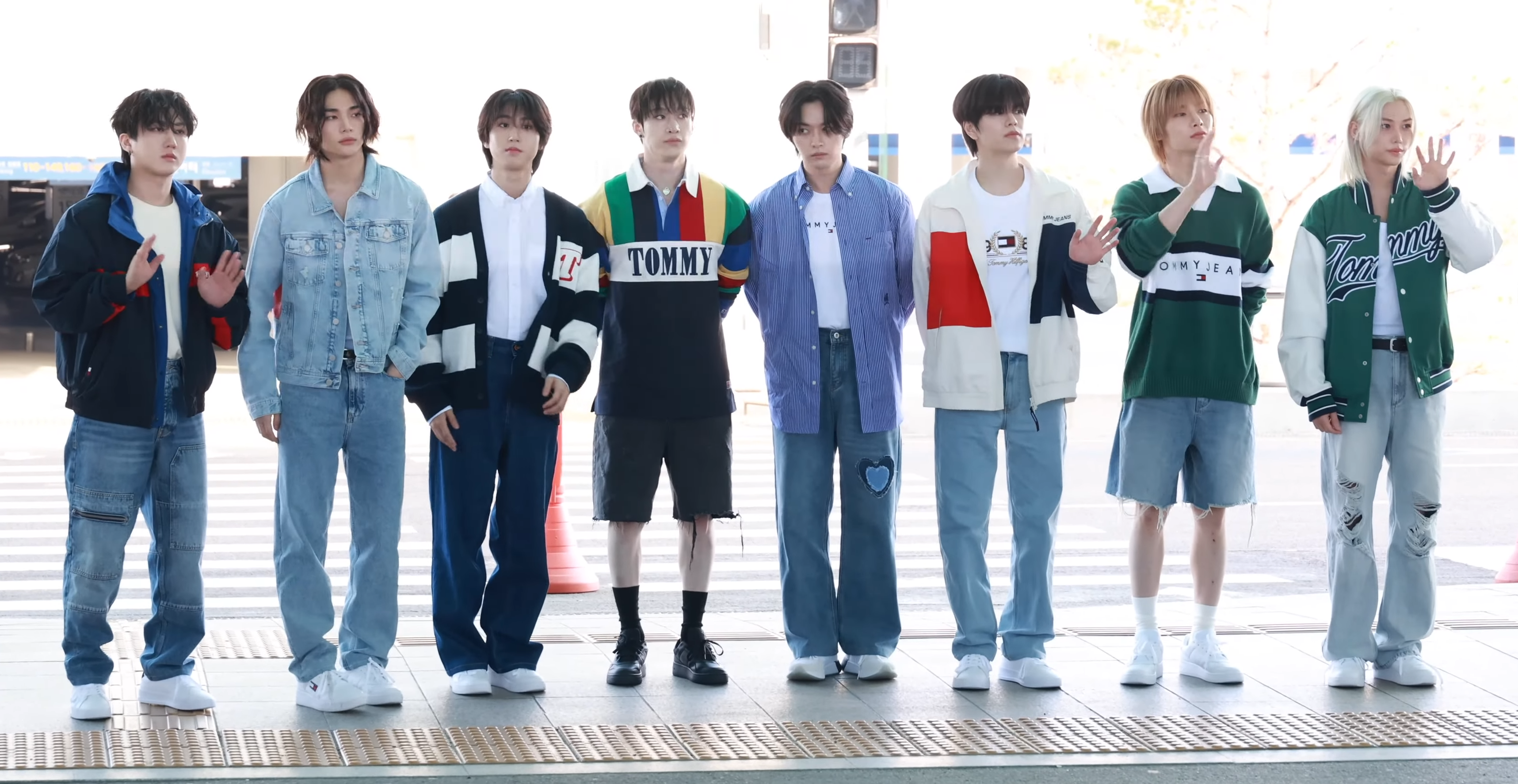
Stray Kids at Incheon Airport in May 2024

Stray Kids held two fan meetings in 2024: SKZ's Magic School in Seoul from March 29 to 31 and SKZ Toy World in Osaka and Saitama in April. Stray Kids performed the theme for the Japanese television drama Re: Revenge – Yokubo no Hate ni, titled "Why?", which was released on April 12. Stray Kids attended the 2024 Met Gala as guests of the designer Tommy Hilfiger. They were the first K-pop act all members of which appeared together at the Met Gala and ranked number one in Red Carpet Power Rankings in the male category, according to The Hollywood Reporter. Stray Kids released the single "Lose My Breath", featuring American singer-songwriter Charlie Puth, on May 10. The song peaked at number 90 on the Billboard Hot 100 and number 97 on the UK Singles Chart.

On July 18, 2024, JYP announced the members of Stray Kids had renewed their contracts with the company, and the band's ninth Korean-language EP, Ate, and its lead single, "Chk Chk Boom", were released the next day. The EP peaked at number one on album charts in South Korea, Austria, Belgium, France, Greece, Hungary, Poland, Portugal, and the United States. Stray Kids became the first group and the second act to top the Billboard 200 with their first five charted releases. "Chk Chk Boom" also became the band's highest peak on the UK Singles Chart and the Billboard Hot 100, at numbers 30 and 49, respectively. In support of the EP, the group headlined major music festivals I-Days in Milan, BST Hyde Park in London, and Lollapalooza in Chicago. The band also embarked on the Dominate World Tour starting in August in Seoul and traveled to Asia, Australia, Latin America, North America, and Europe.

In October 2024, Stray Kids became the second K-pop group to perform at the American Music Awards, following BTS. The band released the second Japanese-language studio album titled Giant on November 13, featuring the opening theme "Night" and ending theme "Falling Up" for the "Workshop Battle" arc of the second season of Kami no Tō: Tower of God. On December 13, they issued the mixtape, marketed as "SKZhop Hiptape", Hop, alongside the lead single "Walkin on Water". It combines hip-hop influences, introducing music under the 'SKZhop' genre, a term blending the group's initials, "SKZ", and "hip hop". The mixtape peaked at number one on the album charts in South Korea and the United States. Stray Kids officially became the first act ever to top the Billboard 200 with their first six charted releases. Also in 2024, Stray Kids performed two soundtrack songs: "Slash" and "Come Play" (with Young Miko and Tom Morello) for the American superhero film Deadpool & Wolverine (2024) and the television series Arcane, respectively. According to IFPI, Stray Kids was the fifth best-selling artist in 2024, while Ate was the tenth best-selling album.

=== 2025: Hollow, Karma, and Do It ===
In 2025, Stray Kids held the fifth fan meeting, SKZ 5'Clock, for three days from February 14 to 16 at Inspire Arena; the third day was broadcast via Beyond Live. The group released the single album Mixtape: Dominate on March 21, the fifth installment of the "Mixtape Project" series. It includes the Korean version of "Giant" from the second Japanese-language album of the same name and four sub-unit tracks, which debuted at the Latin America leg of the Dominate World Tour. They released the Japanese-language EP Hollow on June 18, supported by the lead single of the same name. The album debuted at number one on the Oricon Albums Chart and Billboard Japan Hot Albums.

Stray Kids's fourth Korean-language studio album, Karma, was released on August 22, 2025, supported by the lead single, "Ceremony". The album topped several national charts, including those of South Korea, France, Germany, and the United States. The album made Stray Kids the first act in Billboard history to debut at the top of the Billboard 200 with the first seven entries. The album has sold 3.03 million in its first week, becoming the best-selling 2025 album in South Korea. The band featured on the track "In the Dark" from DJ Snake's third studio album, Nomad.

To conclude the Dominate World Tour, Stray Kids held the encore concert of the Dominate World Tour titled Dominate: Celebrate on October 18 and 19 at Incheon Asiad Main Stadium, Incheon. Following the tour's conclusion, Stray Kids announced the second mixtape, the "SKZ It Tape" Do It, released on November 21. The title track and "Divine" serve as the mixtape's dual lead singles. The album peaked at number one on the album charts in South Korea and the United States. Stray Kids officially became the first act ever to top the Billboard 200 with their first eight charted releases. According to IFPI, Stray Kids was the second best-selling artist worldwide in 2025, their highest rank ever, behind only Taylor Swift.

=== 2026–present: This & That and Suiatsu ===
For Japanese activities, Stray Kids held an exhibition commemorating the fifth anniversary of their Japanese debut, titled "We Stay, Together", in five cities throughout Japan from December 2025 to April 2026, and their virtual concert, Lynkpop: Stray Kids World Tour <Dominate Japan> VR at Seibu Shibuya, Tokyo between March and June 2026. The band returned to Le Gala des Pièces Jaunes for the second time on January 22, 2026. The Dominate World Tour's concert film Stray Kids: The Dominate Experience premiered on February 6, 2026.

To commemorate their eighth anniversary, Stray Kids released the single "Stay" on March 25, and held their sixth fanmeeting, Stay in Our Little House, on March 28–29 and April 4–5 at the Inspire Arena. The band headlined major music festival, the Governors Ball Music Festival, in New York City in June. The band released the compilation, SKZ-Replay 2026 Pt.1, on August 1 to commemorate the eighth anniversary of their official fan club Stay, and is set to release the tenth South Korean-language EP, This & That, on August 7, 2026, supported by the lead single "Run It", and the title track. The EP became the ninth number-one album in the US with their biggest sales in a week, extending the record for the first act to debut the first nine entries at number one on the chart, and the second most number-one album in the US by a group act, behind only the Beatles (19). They embarked on their Run It World Tour, starting in Seoul in July, and, in September, debuted their own music festival, StrayCity, in Latin America, which received 270,000 attendees, and performed at Rock in Rio in Brazil as a headliner. Stray Kids is set to release their fifth Japanese-language EP, Suiatsu, on November 25.

== Artistry ==
=== Musical style ===
"God's Menu" (2020)
"God's Menu" is described as spicy music and the pioneer of the mala taste genre.

Stray Kids's music is inspired by hip-hop, dubstep, heavy metal, electroclash, and dance-pop. It has been described as "dark and experimental". After the release of the album Go Live, the public and some entertainment media outlets began calling Stray Kids the pioneers of "mala taste music" (Korean: 마라맛 음악; RR: Maramat eumak), a name they adopted from the hot, spicy mala seasoning, and it became a rising music trend among K-pop boy groups. The band's songs initially received criticism for being too "noisy"; with the album Noeasy, they embraced the criticism, saying the term was "something that [they] could use as [their] own weapon". During a showcase of Rock-Star EP, the band's members said they plan to retain their tenacious music with principles (Korean: 줏대; RR: jutdae; lit. 'strong spine'). Stray Kids said they want their music to be recognized as a new genre, stating in a 2023 interview with Time: "The goal is to continuously pioneer new [musical] subjects and to have our music be recognized as a 'Stray Kids' genre".

Experimental music and genre fusion have been the core elements of Stray Kids's music output since the beginning of their career. Their debut song, "District 9", is a hybrid genre that combines hip-hop, rock, and EDM with frenetic bass, sirens, aggressive raps. They attempted a new sound with "Side Effects", a propulsive, EDM-pop hybrid song inspired by psytrance. "God's Menu" is said to have a new genre called "mala taste", which is defined as hot, strong, and spicy songs. In "Thunderous", they used contemporary synths and drops to blend traditional Korean instruments such as the kkwaenggwari (꽹과리; lit. 'a small, flat, brass gong') and traditional Korean drums. "Maniac" is a Middle Eastern-influenced, "powerful" trap song with a bass-synth drop and bird-chirping sounds. "Case 143" is a pop song that incorporates a descending chromatic scale, changes in key signature, intense rap verses, and a flexible rhythm. "S-Class" is a hip hop track with boom bap, old school, and pop elements. It was mixed between booming rap, thrumming bass, sultry electro, 1990s hip-hop, sparkling pop, and grimy club. "Lalalala" is rock-leaning phonk music with a harsh rap tone throughout the song, except for the bridge part, which is almost orchestral-like.

=== Songwriting and lyrical themes ===
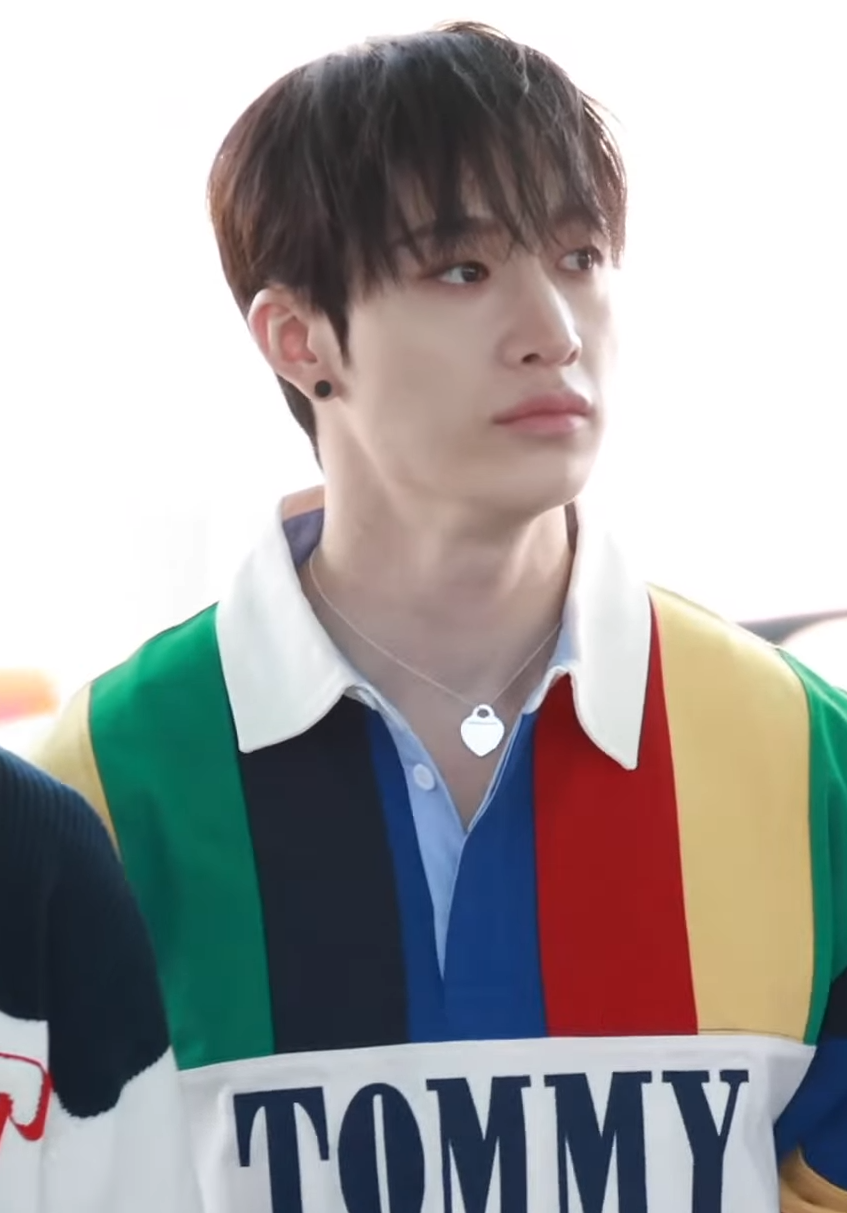
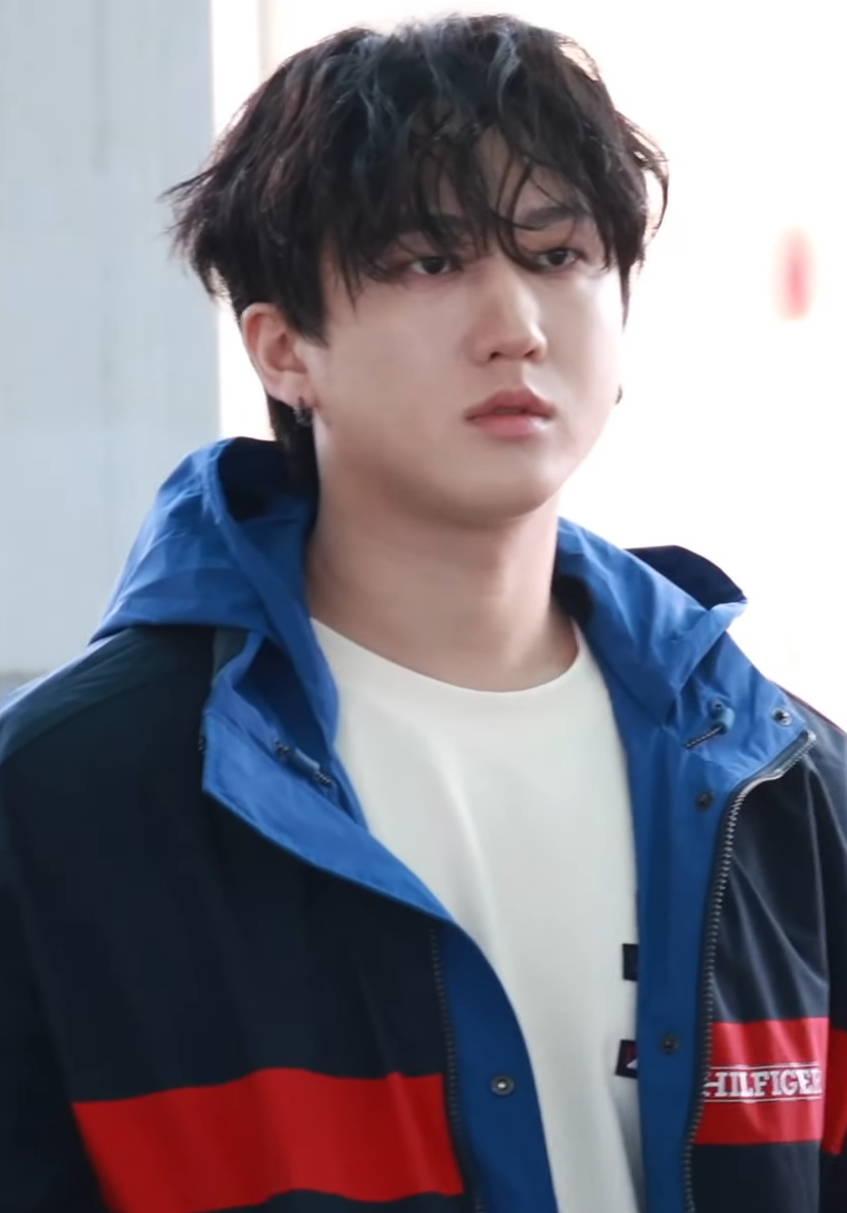
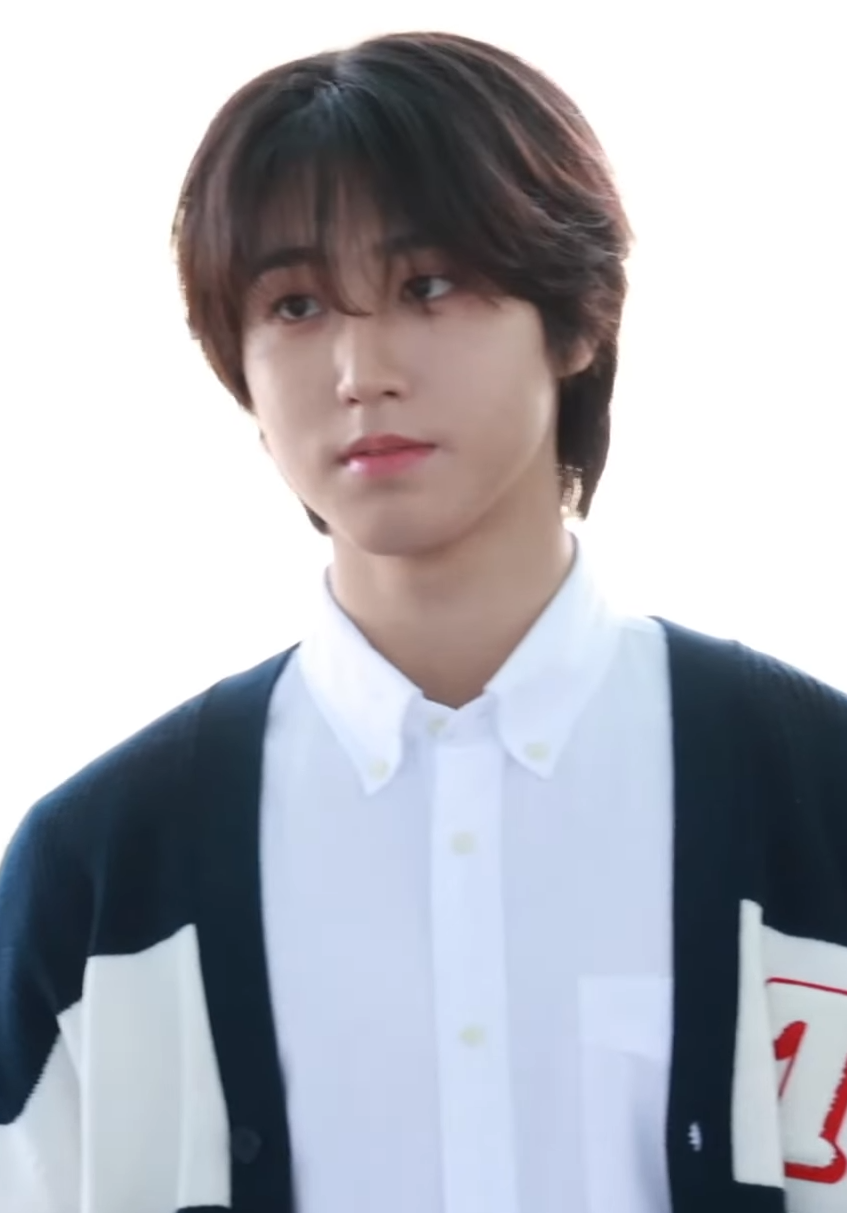
Bang Chan (left), Changbin (center), and Han (right), collectively known as 3Racha, wrote and produced almost all of Stray Kids's releases.

Stray Kids is a "self-producing" idol group even before their official debut, whose members have been involved in majority of songwriting and composing, and have sometimes assisted in arranging. The band's in-house production team, known as 3Racha, consists of the members Bang Chan, Changbin, and Han, who have been releasing self-produced tracks on SoundCloud since 2017 and are largely responsible for crafting Stray Kids's music, with all members integral to the process. All of the members have YouTube projects like SKZ-Record and SKZ-Player, where each of them produce, choreograph, or cover songs; (Note: Some self-produced songs were later officially released in the compilation album SKZ-Replay.) Two Kids Song, where the members were paired to write, produce, and record an original song with the same beat sample; (Note: The result of the Two Kids Song series was not officially released but only uploaded on Stray Kids's official YouTube channel. Team Bang Chan-Felix with "One More Page" (한장더), Team Lee Know-Han with "Ice Americano", Team Changbin-I.N with "Sensitive Boss" (Yeah민Boss), and Team Hyunjin-Seungmin with "King of Nagging" (잔소리 대마왕).) and SKZ Song Camp: Howl in Harmony, where the members were divided into three teams and produced their own songs. (Note: The result of SKZ Song Camp: Howl in Harmony is included in the album Noeasy. Team Bang Chan-Hyunjin with "Red Lights" (강박), Team Lee Know-Changbin-Felix with "Surfin", and Team Han-Seungmin-I.N with "Gone Away".)

The main lyrical theme of Stray Kids's songs is the process and hardship of searching for their identity, especially in their early EP albums, the I Am ... series and the Clé series. In "District 9", the lyrics implied the band members were frustrated by people questioning their identity, which they acknowledged they had not yet found. In "My Pace", the lyrics imply that comparison with others can cause nervousness or anxiety, but each person has their own pace. The lyrics of "I Am You" are about the band thanking their audience for supporting them, even when they did not know themselves. "Miroh" implies Stray Kids's strength, energy, and aspiration to enter a rough "maze" (Korean: 미로; RR: Miro) to achieve their dreams. In "Side Effects", the members rebelled because they wanted to do what they chose, even though that may result in side effects. The lyrics imply it is okay to "shout 'my head hurts'" in difficult situations, but not give up because the side effects are never permanent. The lyrics of "Levanter" (Korean: 바람; RR: baram; lit. 'wind') imply the keys they searched for were within them and that Stray Kids must be themselves to continue their journey following the wind.

After the completion of the I Am ... and Clé series, Stray Kids found their own identity, and the band's lyrical themes shifted. They introduced "God's Menu" as their unique sound; the song uses culinary metaphors like "Welcome, it's easy to choose what you want in our kitchen. Anything on the menu will satisfy all your five senses", "This is our tang, tang, tang, tang" (Korean: 탕; RR: tang; lit. 'soup'), and "You ask, 'What's our secret ingredient?' But we don't even use one". Stray Kids received some criticism because their sound was considered too "noisy" by some, yet they "embrace[ed their] noisiness" in the lyrics of "Thunderous". In "Maniac", the band encouraged their audience to embrace their own "quirkness". "S-Class" is the continuation of the previous album Oddinary, in which they shout, "The odd one, that's me!". In "S-Class" they invite listeners to do the same in the lyrics: "Be the one to shine instead of chasing after what's shiny". "Lalalala" celebrates the band members' lives and career, pushing through pain to find joy and release through music.

The band's B-sides often discuss self-reflection. On their debut album, the songs "Mirror" and "3rd Eye" discuss the difficulties of finding one's true self; in the song "Awaken", they stress the importance of fighting one's way out of a shell. Some Stray Kids songs challenge new themes that differ from their other releases, like "Case 143" from Maxident, their first release explicitly about romantic love.

Stray Kids are known for using wordplay in lyrics and song titles. The album title Go Live combines the English word "go" with the Korean hanja for "life" (Korean: GO生; RR: go-saeng). However, the pronunciation gosaeng (Korean: 고생) can also mean "hardship" in Korean. The album's song "God's Menu" also contains wordplay from the hanja word for "god" and the hangul word for "menu" (Korean: 神메뉴; RR: sinmenyu; lit. 'God's Menu'), but the pronunciation "sin-menu" (신메뉴) can also mean "new menu" in Korean. In Noeasy, the album's title combines "no" and "easy" to mean "not easy", but its pronunciation sounds like "noisy". Its track "Thunderous" has a different Korean title, "소리꾼" (Korean: 소리꾼; RR: sorikkun; lit. 'singers of pansori'), which combines the word "소리" (Korean: 소리; RR: sori; lit. 'sound') and "꾼" (Korean: 꾼; RR: kkun; lit. 'suffix for a "doer"'), which can also mean a person who "does sound very well". The Korean title of the song "Lalalala" (Korean: 락; Hanja: 樂; RR: rak; lit. 'pleasure') is also a wordplay with "rock", expressing the meaning of "although you will feel any emotions in life, you hope the last emotion you choose will be pleasure".

=== Stage performance and concept aesthetics ===
Stray Kids has been acknowledged for the band's stage and performance through multiple daesang (Note: A daesang (대상; lit. 'grand prize') is the highest honor given out at South Korean music award ceremonies in recognition of the artist(s) with the greatest physical and digital achievements for the year.) (grand prize) awards in this category, such as the Performance of the Year award at the 2021 Asia Artist Awards (AAA), the Stage of the Year award at the 2023 AAA, and the Best Performance awards at the award at the Hanteo Music Awards (HMA) in 2023 and 2024. They also earned the title "K-Performance Leaders" (Korean: K-퍼포먼스 대장주; RR: Keipeopomeonseu daejangju). Industry figures and the media have praised the band's stage performances during year-end award shows.

Stray Kids earned the title "Concept Matjib" (Korean: 콘셉트 맛집; RR: konsepteu matjib; lit. 'place/person with great concept') for their innovative concept in each release. The band's concepts are shown in the choreography, music videos, stage outfits, and music style; the group's stylist, whose pseudonym on Instagram is Doooho, received praise for styling the band's outfits. "God's Menu" choreography incorporates mixing, frying, seasoning, and chopping to match the song's culinary concept. Door-knocking choreography is used for "Back Door". In the music video for "Thunderous", the band members danced in dokkaebi styles with pungmul folks and white lions in front of a hanok to incorporate Korean folklore. For "Maniac", they referenced Frankenstein's monster in the lyrics, choreography, and concept photographs.

Stray Kids incorporate choreography and stage properties to complete their concept aesthetics, especially for year-end shows and competitions. During the 35th Golden Disc Awards, Stray Kids performed "God's Menu" with elegant dance moves and a huge fan and received a best performance award for the first time. During the 2020 SBS Gayo Daejeon performance, they performed a nanta show to emphasize the cooking theme of "God's Menu". During the 2021 SBS Gayo Daejeon, they performed "Winter Falls" and "Thunderous" (Christmas version) with point choreography using canes, a performance that staged scenes from the popular Netflix drama Squid Game, and Felix's tap dance.

The group competed in and won the 2021 competition show Kingdom: Legendary War, where they performed for five rounds, including the introduction stage. Experts from the industry praised Stray Kids for their creative performances, which made the most of the visual effects with LED flashlights and the emotional effects with acrobatic choreographies and acting based on a storyline. The particular performance of a mashup between "God's Menu" and "Ddu-Du Ddu-Du" by Blackpink, with a concept from Deadpool, received praise from industry figures and the public, including the Deadpool actor Ryan Reynolds and his friend, actor Hugh Jackman. The praise from the actors led to Stray Kids's participation in one of the soundtracks for Deadpool & Wolverine (2024).

== Other ventures ==
=== Endorsements ===
In February 2018, before Stray Kids's official debut, the nine members were announced as new models for the spring collection of Jambangee Jeans. In June, the members were selected as exclusive models for Ivy Club for the 2018 fall semester. The next month, Stray Kids partnered with Minute Maid Sparkling, and five days later were chosen as promotional models for CGV's Youth Brand Festival.

In June 2019, Stray Kids was chosen as the newest ambassador of the Talk Talk Korea Contest, and on June 18, the Korean Culture and Information Service under the Ministry of Culture, Sports and Tourism appointed the band members as honorary ambassadors. In September 2019, Stray Kids began endorsing Lotte Duty Free and took part in the company's campaign "Let's Do Something Fun". On October 16, Stray Kids became models for the Korean sportswear brand Pro-Specs.

In November 2020, Stray Kids was chosen to become Shopee Indonesia's brand ambassador for two promotional sales.

On February 1, 2021, Stray Kids was chosen to become new models for Clio Cosmetics. In June 2021, the group was chosen to endorse the Japanese clothing brand Wego and as ambassadors for the Korea Pavilion of Expo 2020 in Dubai, UAE. In September, the group was chosen to become new models for the cosmetic brand Nacific, and the group's sub-unit Danceracha (Lee Know, Hyunjin, and Felix) appeared in campaigns for the Italian brand Etro's unisex sneaker Earthbeat.

In 2022, Stray Kids became the muse for the clothing brand Mahagrid's 2022 Summer T-shirt Campaign and ambassadors for the Philippine clothing brand Bench. The brand held a fan meeting on January 20, 2023, at SM Mall of Asia Arena. The group, together with Super Junior, again served as models for Lotte Duty Free in September 2022. A month later, three short dramas were released as part of the "LDF Original Series" new campaign featuring Stray Kids members.

In 2023, Stray Kids were selected as models for mobile-phone accessories brand SLBS and launched the "Star to Galaxy" campaign to work with the group's SKZoo characters for a special Samsung Z Flip model, as well as Indonesian milk product Ultra Milk's brand ambassador.

In 2024, Bioré UV chose Stray Kids for its global campaign, "Sunlight Is Your Spotlight". The group's song "Endless Sun" featured on the campaign in 2026. In 2025, the group became a global ambassador for cookie stick brand Pepero. Additionally, they had SKZoo character collaborations with Tamagotchi, A Bathing Ape's Baby Milo, the Disney animated film Zootopia 2, and Roblox for a virtual concert.

In 2026, Stray Kids collaborated with the Korea Tourism Organization as part of its new inbound tourism campaign "BIAS (Be In Artists' Scenes)", to promote famous landmarks and experiential products in South Korea.

=== Fashion ===
Stray Kids was selected to be the Asian ambassador of Tommy Hilfiger for the company's campaigns in Fall 2023 and Spring and Fall 2024. In May 2024, Stray Kids made their Met Gala debut as the guest of designer Tommy Hilfiger, wearing overcoats on top of tailored suits of the brand's signature red, white, and blue with gold accents. They are the first group to attend the event together.

Individually, Stray Kids members have been appointed as ambassadors of various brands: Hyunjin for Versace in July 2023, Cartier in September 2024, Guess in March 2026, and Dior in November 2026; Felix for Louis Vuitton in August 2023; Bang Chan for Fendi, I.N for Bottega Veneta and Damiani, Seungmin for Burberry, and Lee Know for Gucci in 2025; and Changbin for Autry and Han for Tod's in 2026. Both Hyunjin and Felix attended the respective brand's events; Hyunjin fronted Versace's Holiday 2023 campaign, and Felix made his runway debut at Paris Fashion Week for Louis Vuitton Women's Fall/Winter 2024 Collection on March 5, 2024.

=== Philanthropy ===
Stray Kids is known as the "Donation Idol" (Korean: 기부돌; RR: gibudol) for the members' various participations in donating. Stray Kids participated in JYPE's "Every Dream Matters!" (EDM) campaign to help support terminally ill children's wishes. In 2021, Bang Chan hosted the 2021 JYP EDM Day on JYPE's social media account with J.Y. Park and Twice's Sana. They introduced the EDM projects and shared the results of the EDM Wish Day project, EDM Treatment Cost Support Project, and Love Earth project as part of EDM social contribution works in 2021. In February 2023, they participated in JYP EDM Wish Day activities by virtually granting wishes of overseas children with incurable diseases. In December, Bang Chan hosted the 2023 JYP EDM Day with J.Y. Park and Twice's Jihyo, where they shared the results of that year's EDM social contribution works and Stray Kids's participation in mentoring underprivileged Korean youths who aspire to be singers and dancers for a day.

On April 1, 2025, Stray Kids donated a total of ₩800 million (US$596,892) — ₩400 million to the Hope Bridge Korea Disaster Relief Association and ₩400 million to the World Vision social welfare corporation—with a request that it be used for the urgent support of residents affected by the large wildfires in Gyeongsang regions. The funds will be used for emergency relief supplies, urgent living expenses, support for firefighters, and more for the wildfire-affected residents. In November 2025, Stray Kids donated HK$1 million (US$128,700) to the Hong Kong Red Cross following the 2025 Tai Po apartment complex fire.

== Impact ==
Stray Kids was featured in Time's 2023 Next Generation Leaders list for their success in global markets. Rolling Stone UK called them the biggest band in the world with many record-breaking milestones. Stray Kids became the seventh-best-selling artist globally in 2022, according to the IFPI. In 2023, Stray Kids was noted as the first K-Pop group to exceed five million album pre-orders for 5-Star; 5-Star and Rock-Star were noted as the second- and fifth-best-selling albums worldwide, respectively. The IFPI named Stray Kids as the third-best-selling artist globally that year, behind Taylor Swift and Seventeen. Stray Kids also became the first act to break the record of the first six consecutive Billboard 200 No. 1 entries with the release of Oddinary, Maxident, 5-Star, Rock-Star, Ate, and Hop; the streak continued with the release of Karma and Do It. As of May 2026, Stray Kids had sold over 40 million albums in both Korean and Japanese.

Stray Kids was recognized for their music and performance, having performed as a headliner at major international music festivals like Lollapalooza (Paris in 2023, then Chicago in 2024), BST Hyde Park, and I-Days, and was the first K-pop boy band and the first K-pop act to do so. Pop culture critic Ha Jae-geun acknowledged Stray Kids for high-standard performances, skills, and music, which he said consistently meets or exceeds a certain level of quality and naturally brought global audiences to notice the band members' charms. In August 2024, Stray Kids became the first K-pop artist to appear on the cover of Rolling Stone UK. In 2025, the band appeared on Forbes Asia's 30 Under 30 in the Entertainment and Sports category, and its South Korean edition's Korean Idols of the Year, ranked number three. Carcinonepa libererrantes, an ancient true water bug fossil trapped in amber found in 2026 in Kachin State, Myanmar, was named after Stray Kids by latinization.

Stray Kids's work has influenced other artists, including Ghost9, Trendz, Dxmon, Nexz, All(H)Ours, WHIB, Commander Man, and KickFlip.

== Awards and achievements ==
Stray Kids has won numerous awards throughout their career. On April 19, 2019, Stray Kids won its first music program with "Miroh" at Show Champion. Stray Kids has received numerous trophies in South Korea and internationally, including eleven AAA, six Circle Chart Music Awards, nine The Fact Music Awards, seven Golden Disc Awards, six HMA, seven MAMA Awards, two Japan Gold Disc Awards, two Billboard Music Awards, an iHeartRadio Music Award, an MTV Europe Music Award, an MTV Video Music Award, an MTV Video Music Award Japan, a Nickelodeon Mexico Kids' Choice Award, and a People's Choice Award. They have won six daesang: three consecutive Asia Artist Awards (2021–2023), two consecutive Best Performance awards at the Hanteo Music Awards (2022–2023), and an Asia Star Entertainer Award (2024).

Stray Kids is the first K-pop group that sell over five million album pre-orders. On June 1, 2023, the 5-Star album reportedly exceeded 5.13 million pre-orders. On October 21, 2023, Stray Kids was honored with the Prime Minister's Commendation at the Korean Popular Culture and Arts Awards, in recognition of public service and/or excellence in a given field. According to Oricon, Stray Kids was one of the top-ten best-selling artists in Japan from 2022 to 2025.

== Members ==
On October 28, 2019, Stray Kids member Woojin left the band and terminated his contract with JYPE for undisclosed personal reasons. From February to July 2021, Hyunjin was on hiatus due to allegations of bullying against him but resumed regular activities with the group in August. Bang Chan, Changbin, and Han are also members of the in-house songwriting and production team 3Racha and are frequently involved in writing lyrics and composing for the group.

Current members

- Bang Chan (방찬) – leader, vocalist, rapper, dancer
- Lee Know (리노) – dancer, vocalist
- Changbin (창빈) – rapper
- Hyunjin (현진) – dancer, rapper
- Han (한) – rapper, vocalist
- Felix (필릭스) – dancer, rapper
- Seungmin (승민) – vocalist
- I.N (아이엔) – vocalist

Former members

- Woojin (우진) – vocalist (2017–2019)

== Discography ==
Korean studio albums

- Go Live (2020)
- Noeasy (2021)
- 5-Star (2023)
- Karma (2025)

Japanese studio albums

- The Sound (2023)
- Giant (2024)

== Filmography ==
=== Films ===
List of Stray Kids film appearances and roles
Year	Title	Role	Ref.
2023	SKZflix	Themselves	
2026	The Dominate Experience	Themselves	

=== Television series ===
List of Stray Kids's television appearances and roles
Year	Title	Role	Notes	Ref.
2017	Stray Kids	Contestant		
2019	Finding SKZ	Cast member		
2020	Finding SKZ God Edition	Cast member		
2021	Kingdom: Legendary War	Contestant	Hyunjin did not participate starting from episode 2	
2021	Kingdom Week <No+>	Cast member		
2022	Finding SKZ Get Edition	Cast member		
2023	Stray Kids Tokyo Mission Tour	Cast member		
2026	Soul Beam	Cast member	Korean New Year special	

== Concert tours ==
- District 9: Unlock World Tour (2019–2020)
- Maniac World Tour (2022–2023)
- 5-Star Dome Tour (2023)
- Dominate World Tour (2024–2025)
- Run It World Tour (2026–2027)
