= List of songs recorded by Stray Kids =

The following is a complete list of songs under the credit South Korean boy band Stray Kids, including songs released unofficially (SKZ-Player and SKZ-Record) and songs featuring other artists.

== Songs ==
Key
| | Song released as a single |
| | Song initially released as part of SKZ-Player and SKZ-Record or otherwise |
| † | Song available in Korean and Japanese |
| ‡ | Song available in Korean, Japanese and English |
| ⁂ | Song available in Korean and English |
| # | Song available in English and Japanese |

Name of song, featured performers, lyricist, composer, arranger/producer, originating album, and year released
| Song | Artist(s) | Lyrics | Composition | Arrangement / producer(s) | Album | Year | Ref. |
|---|---|---|---|---|---|---|---|
| "0325" | Stray Kids | Bang Chan (3Racha); Changbin (3Racha); Han (3Racha) | Bang Chan; Changbin; Han; Hong Ji-sang | Hong Ji-sang | I Am You | 2018 | |
| "0801" | Stray Kids | Bang Chan | Bang Chan; Versachoi | Versachoi | Karma | 2025 | |
| "19" | Stray Kids | Han | Bang Chan; Han | Chan | Clé 1: Miroh | 2019 | |
| "24 to 25" | Stray Kids | Bang Chan | Bang Chan; Nickko Young | Bang Chan; Nickko Young | Christmas EveL | 2021 | |
| "3Racha" | Bang Chan; Changbin; Han | Bang Chan; Changbin; Han | Bang Chan; Changbin; Han | Bang Chan; Versachoi | Maxident | 2022 | |
| "3rd Eye" | Stray Kids | Bang Chan; Changbin; Han | Bang Chan; Changbin; Han; This N That | This N That | I Am Not | 2018 | |
| "4419" | Stray Kids | Bang Chan; Changbin; Han; Seungmin; Hyunjin | Bang Chan; Changbin; Han; RealBros (Ohwon Lee) | RealBros (Ohwon Lee) | Mixtape | 2018 | |
| "After You" | Stray Kids | Bang Chan; Changbin; Han; Stefan Johnson; Jordan K. Johnson; Jackson Foote; Oliver Peterhof | Bang Chan; Changbin; Han; Stefan Johnson; Jordan K. Johnson; Jackson Foote; Oliver Peterhof | The Monsters & Strangerz & German | This & That | 2026 | |
| "Ai o Kureta no ni, Naze" (愛をくれたのに、なぜ) | Stray Kids | Changbin; Bang Chan; KM-Markit (Note: Signifies a Japanese lyricist) | Changbin; Bang Chan; Kim Ju-hyeong | Kim Ju-hyeong | Giant | 2024 | |
| "Airplane" (비행기) | Stray Kids | MosPick $un Young Chance; Bang Chan; Changbin | MosPick $un Young Chance; Bang Chan; Changbin | MosPick $un | Go Live | 2020 | |
| "Alien" (외계인) | Han | Han | Han; Bang Chan | Bang Chan | SKZ-Replay | 2021 | |
| "All In"† | Stray Kids | J.Y. Park "The Asiansoul"; Bang Chan; Changbin; Han (KM-Markit) | J.Y. Park "The Asiansoul"; Bang Chan; Changbin; Han; Young Chance | J.Y. Park "The Asiansoul"; Lee Hae-sol | All In | 2020 | |
| "All My Life" (Stray Kids remix) | Lil Durk featuring Stray Kids | Durk Banks; Jermaine Cole; Łukasz Gottwald; Rocco Valdes; Ryan Ogren; Gamal Lewis; Theron Thomas; Bang Chan; Changbin; Han | | Dr. Luke | All My Life (Remix) | 2023 | |
| "Another Day" (일상) | Stray Kids | Han | Han; Bang Chan | Bang Chan | Go Live | 2020 | |
| "Any" (아니) | Stray Kids | Bang Chan; Changbin; Han | Bang Chan; Changbin; Han; Matluck; Tele | Tele; Bang Chan | In Life | 2020 | |
| "As We Are" (그렇게, 천천히, 우리) | Seungmin | Seungmin | Seungmin; Hong Ji-sang | Hong Ji-sang | Hop | 2024 | |
| "Astronaut" | Stray Kids | Bang Chan; Changbin; Han | Bang Chan; Changbin; Han; Lorenzo Cosi; YK Koi | Lorenzo Cosi; YK Koi | Clé: Levanter | 2019 | |
| "Awaken" | Stray Kids | Bang Chan; Changbin; Han | Bang Chan; Changbin; Han; Kim Park Chella | Kim Park Chella; Bang Chan | I Am Not | 2018 | |
| "Awkward Silence" (갑자기 분위기 싸해질 필요 없잖아요) | Stray Kids | Bang Chan; Changbin; Han | Bang Chan; Changbin; Han; Time | Time | I Am Who | 2018 | |
| "B Me" | Stray Kids | Bang Chan; Changbin; Han; Earattack | Bang Chan; Changbin; Han; Earattack | Earattack; Larmook | In Life | 2020 | |
| "Back Door"† | Stray Kids | Bang Chan; Changbin; Han (KM-Markit) | Bang Chan; Changbin; Han; HotSauce | HotSauce; Bang Chan | In Life; All In | 2020 | |
| "Baby" | Bang Chan | Bang Chan | Bang Chan; Versachoi | Bang Chan; Versachoi | SKZ-Replay 2026 Pt.1 | 2026 | |
| "Back Then" | Stray Kids | Han | Han; Vendors (Helixx) | Vendors (Helixx) | This & That | 2026 | |
| "Battle Ground"† | Stray Kids | Bang Chan; Changbin; Han (KM-Markit) | Bang Chan; Changbin; Han; Frants | Bang Chan; Frants | The Sound; SKZ-Replay 2026 Pt.1 | 2023 | |
| "Because" (좋으니까) | Changbin; Felix | Changbin; Felix | Changbin; Bang Chan | Bang Chan | SKZ-Replay | 2021 | |
| "Beware" (Grrr 총량의 법칙) | Stray Kids | Bang Chan; Changbin; Han | Bang Chan; Changbin; Han; Armadillo; Trippy; 1Take | Trippy | Mixtape | 2018 | |
| "Bleep" (삐처리) | Stray Kids | Bang Chan; Changbin; Han | Bang Chan; Changbin; Han; Versachoi | Versachoi; Bang Chan | Karma | 2025 | |
| "Blind Spot" (사각지대) | Stray Kids | Bang Chan; Changbin; Han | Bang Chan; Changbin; Han; Willie Weeks | Willie Weeks; Bang Chan | Rock-Star | 2023 | |
| "Blueprint" (청사진) | Stray Kids | Lee Seu-ran; Earattack; Bang Chan; Changbin; Han | Earattack; Eniac | Earattack; Eniac | Go Live | 2020 | |
| "Booster" | Stray Kids | Bang Chan; Changbin; Han | Christian Fast; Henrik Nordenback; Albin Nordqvist | Henrik Nordenback | Clé: Levanter | 2019 | |
| "Bounce Back" | Stray Kids | Bang Chan; Han | Versachoi; Bang Chan; Han | Versachoi; Bang Chan | Hop | 2024 | |
| "Boxer" | Stray Kids | Bang Chan; Changbin; Han | Bang Chan; Changbin; Han; Glory Face (Full8loom); Jake K (Full8loom) | Glory Face (Full8loom); Jake K (Full8loom) | Clé 1: Miroh | 2019 | |
| "Burnin' Tires" | Changbin; I.N | Changbin; I.N | Changbin; I.N; Restart; Chae Gang-hae | Restart; Chae Gang-hae | Mixtape: Dominate | 2025 | |
| "Butterflies" | Stray Kids | Bang Chan; Versachoi; D&H; Yohei | Bang Chan; Versachoi | Bang Chan; Versachoi | Social Path / Super Bowl (Japanese Ver.) | 2023 | |
| "Call" | Stray Kids | Han; KM-Markit | Han; Bang Chan | Bang Chan | Scars" / "Thunderous" (Japanese ver.) | 2021 | |
| "Can't Stop" (나 너 좋아하나봐) | Seungmin; I.N | Seungmin; I.N; Hong Ji-sang | Seungmin; I.N; Hong Ji-sang | Hong Ji-sang | Maxident | 2022 | |
| "Case 143"† | Stray Kids | Bang Chan; Changbin; Han (KM-Markit) | Bang Chan; Changbin; Han; Raphael (Producing Lab); Daviid (3Scape); Yosia (3Scape) | Raphael (Producing Lab); Daviid (3Scape); Yosia (3Scape); Bang Chan | Maxident; The Sound | 2022 | |
| "Ceremony"⁂ | Stray Kids | Bang Chan; Changbin; Han | Bang Chan; Changbin; Han; Versachoi | Versachoi; Bang Chan | Karma | 2025 | |
| "Charmer" | Stray Kids | Bang Chan; Changbin; Han | Bang Chan; Changbin; Han; Versachoi | Versachoi | Oddinary | 2022 | |
| "Cheese" | Stray Kids | Bang Chan; Changbin; Han | Bang Chan; Changbin; Han; Versachoi | Versachoi | Noeasy | 2021 | |
| "Chill" (식혀)† | Stray Kids | Han (KM-Markit) | Han; Bang Chan | Versachoi; Bang Chan | Maxident; The Sound | 2022 | |
| "Chk Chk Boom"† | Stray Kids | Bang Chan; Changbin; Han (D&H) (Shunsuke Takai) | Bang Chan; Changbin; Han; Dallas Koehlke; Ronnie Icon; BB Elliot | DallasK; Bang Chan; Restart; Chae Gang-hae | Ate; Giant | 2024 | |
| "Christmas EveL" | Stray Kids | Bang Chan; Changbin; Han | Bang Chan; Changbin; Han; HotSauce | HotSauce; Bang Chan | Christmas EveL | 2021 | |
| "Christmas Love" | Stray Kids | Bang Chan; Yohei | Bang Chan; Versachoi | Versachoi | Giant | 2024 | |
| "Chronosaurus" | Stray Kids | Bang Chan; Changbin; Han | Bang Chan; Changbin; Han; Kairos; SamUIL | Kairos; SamUIL; K.O | Clé 1: Miroh | 2019 | |
| "Cinema" | Lee Know; Seungmin | Seungmin; Lee Know | Seungmin; Lee Ki-hwan; Cona | Lee Ki-hwan; Cona | Mixtape: Dominate | 2025 | |
| "Circus"† | Stray Kids | Bang Chan; Changbin; Han (KM-Markit) | Bang Chan; Changbin; Han; Earattack; Chan's (Take a Chance) | Bang Chan; Earattack; Chan's; Darm | Circus; Maxident | 2022 | |
| "Close" | Han | Han | Han; Bang Chan | Bang Chan | SKZ-Replay | 2020 | |
| "Collision" (충돌) | Stray Kids | Han | Han; Millionboy | Millionboy | 5-Star | 2023 | |
| "Come Play" | Stray Kids; Young Miko; Tom Morello | Diego López Crespo; Dave Emerson Dahlquist; Ashley Fulton; Kami Kehoe; Tom Morello; Maria Victoria Ramirez de Arellano | | Tom Morello; Kill Dave; Sebastien Najand | Arcane League of Legends: Season 2 | 2024 | |
| "Comflex" | Stray Kids | Bang Chan; Changbin; Han | Bang Chan; Changbin; Han; Millionboy | Millionboy | Rock-Star | 2023 | |
| "Connected" | Bang Chan | Bang Chan | Bang Chan; Versachoi | Bang Chan; Versachoi | SKZ-Replay | 2022 | |
| "Cover Me" (가려줘) | Stray Kids | Hyunjin; Bang Chan | Hyunjin; Bang Chan; Nickko Young | Bang Chan; Nickko Young | Rock-Star | 2023 | |
| "Creed" | Stray Kids | Bang Chan; Changbin; Han | Bang Chan; Changbin; Han; Millionboy | Millionboy; Bang Chan | Karma | 2025 | |
| "Deep End" | Felix | Felix | Felix; Shim Eun-jee | Shim Eun-jee | SKZ-Replay | 2022 | |
| "District 9" | Stray Kids | Bang Chan; Changbin; Han | Bang Chan; Changbin; Han; Trippy | Trippy; Bang Chan | I Am Not; Unveil Stray Kids | 2018 | |
| "Divine" | Stray Kids | Bang Chan; Changbin; Han | Bang Chan; Changbin; Han; JVersachoi | Versachoi; Bang Chan | Do It | 2025 | |
| "DLC" | Stray Kids | Changbin; Restart | Changbin; Restart | Restart; Changbin | 5-Star | 2023 | |
| "DLMLU" | Stray Kids | Hyunjin; Yohei | Hyunjin; Bang Chan; Versachoi | Bang Chan; Versachoi | The Sound | 2023 | |
| "Do It" | Stray Kids | Bang Chan; Changbin; Han; JBach | Bang Chan; Changbin; Han; JBach; Marc Sibley; Nathan Cunningham | Space Primates | Do It | 2025 | |
| "Domino"⁂ | Stray Kids | Bang Chan (Note: Signifies an English lyricist); Changbin; Han; Felix; Junoflo | Bang Chan; Changbin; Han; Versachoi | Versachoi; Bang Chan | Noeasy; Christmas EveL | 2021 | |
| "Don't Say" | Han | Han | Han; Bang Chan | Bang Chan; Versachoi | SKZ-Replay 2026 Pt.1 | 2026 | |
| "Doodle" | Changbin | Changbin | Changbin; Millionboy | Millionboy; Bang Chan | SKZ-Replay | 2022 | |
| "Double Knot"‡ | Stray Kids | Bang Chan; Changbin; Han (KM-Markit) | Bang Chan; Changbin; Han; Nick Furlong; DallasK | DallasK; Bang Chan | Clé: Levanter; Step Out of Clé; SKZ2020 | 2019 | |
| "Drive" | Bang Chan; Lee Know | Bang Chan; Lee Know | Bang Chan; Taalthechoi | Taalthechoi | SKZ-Replay | 2021 | |
| "Easy" | Stray Kids | Bang Chan; Changbin; Han | Bang Chan; Changbin; Han; Mike Daley; Mike J Henry Oyekanmi; Mitchell Owens | Mike Daley; Mitchell Owens | Go Live | 2020 | |
| "Endless Sun" | Stray Kids | Bang Chan; Changbin; Han | Bang Chan; Changbin; Han; Restart; Chae Gang-hae | Restart; Chae Gang-hae; Bang Chan | Non-album single | 2026 | |
| "Entrance" | Stray Kids | —N/a | Bang Chan; Kairos; SamUIL | Bang Chan; Kairos; SamUIL; K.O | Clé 1: Miroh | 2019 | |
| "Escape" | Bang Chan; Hyunjin | Bang Chan; Hyunjin | Bang Chan; Hyunjin; Versachoi | Bang Chan; Versachoi | Mixtape: Dominate | 2025 | |
| "Ex" (미친 놈) | Stray Kids | Bang Chan; Changbin | Bang Chan; Changbin; HotSauce | HotSauce | In Life | 2020 | |
| "Fairytale" | Stray Kids | Han; KM-Markit | Han; Millionboy | Millionboy; Bang Chan | Circus | 2022 | |
| "Falling Up"‡ | Stray Kids | Bang Chan; Changbin (KM-Markit) (Sophia Pae) | Bang Chan; Changbin; Restart; Chae Gang-hae | Restart; Chae Gang-hae; Bang Chan | Giant | 2024 | |
| "Fam"† | Stray Kids | Bang Chan; Changbin; Han; KM-Markit | Bang Chan; Changbin; Han; Versachoi | Bang Chan; Versachoi | All In; SKZ-Replay | 2020 | |
| "Farming" | Stray Kids | Bang Chan; Changbin; Han | Bang Chan; Changbin; Han; Restart; Chae Gang-hae | Restart; Chae Gang-hae; Bang Chan | This & That | 2026 | |
| "Fate" (宿命) | Stray Kids | Changbin; Restart; KM-Markit | Changbin; Restart; Millionboy; Nickko Young | Millionboy; Nickko Young | Hollow | 2025 | |
| "FNF" | Stray Kids | Bang Chan; Felix | Bang Chan; Felix; Trippy | Trippy; Bang Chan | 5-Star | 2023 | |
| "Freeze" (땡) | Stray Kids | Bang Chan; Changbin; Han | Bang Chan; Changbin; Han; Trippy | Trippy; Bang Chan | Oddinary | 2022 | |
| "Get Cool" | Stray Kids | Bang Chan; Changbin; Han; Inner Child (MonoTree) | Yoon Jong-sung (MonoTree); Inner Child (MonoTree); Song Ha-eun; Totem; Bang Chan; Changbin; Han | Yoon Jong-sung (MonoTree); Song Ha-eun | I Am You; Unveil Stray Kids | 2018 | |
| "Get Lit" (죽어보자) | Stray Kids | Han | Han; Chae Gang-hae; Restart | Chae Gang-hae; Restart | 5-Star | 2023 | |
| "Ghost" | Stray Kids | Bang Chan; Changbin | Bang Chan; Changbin; Versachoi | Versachoi; Bang Chan | Karma | 2025 | |
| "Giant"† | Stray Kids | Bang Chan; Changbin; Han; Yohei | Bang Chan; Changbin; Han; Restart; Chae Kang-hae | Restart; Chae Kang-hae; Bang Chan | Giant; Mixtape: Dominate | 2024 | |
| "Give Me Your TMI" | Stray Kids | Bang Chan; Changbin; Han | Bang Chan; Changbin; Han; Tak; 1Take | Tak; 1Take | Maxident | 2022 | |
| "Glow" | Stray Kids | Changbin; Felix; Lee Know | Bang Chan; This N That | Bang Chan; Garden; This N That | Mixtape | 2018 | |
| "Go Live" (GO生) | Stray Kids | Bang Chan; Changbin; Han | Bang Chan; Changbin; Han; Amanda MNDR Warner; Peter Wade Keusch | Amanda MNDR Warner; Peter Wade Keusch | Go Live | 2020 | |
| "God's Menu" (神메뉴; 神メニュー)† | Stray Kids | Bang Chan; Changbin; Han (KM-Markit) | Bang Chan; Changbin; Han; Versachoi | Versachoi | Go Live; All In | 2020 | |
| "Going Dumb" (with Stray Kids) | Alesso; Corsak; Stray Kids | Alessandro Lindblad; Calle Lehmann; Haee | Alessandro Lindblad; Calle Lehmann; Haee | Alesso | Non-album single | 2021 | |
| "Gone Away" | Han; Seungmin; I.N | Han; Seungmin; I.N | Han; Seungmin; I.N; Armadillo; Gump | Armadillo; Gump | Noeasy | 2021 | |
| "Goodbye" | Seungmin | Bang Chan | Bang Chan; Versachoi | Bang Chan; Versachoi | SKZ-Replay 2026 Pt.1 | 2026 | |
| "Grow Up" (잘 하고 있어) | Stray Kids | Bang Chan; Changbin; Han | Bang Chan; Changbin; Han; Trippy | Trippy; Bang Chan | I Am Not; Unveil Stray Kids | 2018 | |
| "Half Time" (반전) | Stray Kids | Bang Chan; Changbin; Han | Bang Chan; Changbin; Han; Versachoi | Versachoi; Bang Chan | Karma | 2025 | |
| "Hall of Fame" (위인전) | Stray Kids | Bang Chan; Changbin; Han | Bang Chan; Changbin; Han; Versachoi | Versachoi; Bang Chan | 5-Star | 2023 | |
| "Hallucination" | I.N | Changbin; I.N; Restart | Changbin; I.N; Chae Gang-hae; Restart | Chae Gang-hae; Restart | Hop | 2024 | |
| "Happy" | Han | Han | Han; Bang Chan | Bang Chan | SKZ-Replay | 2021 | |
| "Haven" | Stray Kids | Bang Chan | Bang Chan; Versachoi | Bang Chan; Versachoi | Go Live | 2020 | |
| "Hellevator" | Stray Kids | Armadillo; Bang Chan; Changbin; Han | Armadillo; Bang Chan; Changbin; Han; Rangga | Armadillo; Bang Chan; Rangga | Mixtape; Unveil Stray Kids | 2017 | |
| "Hello Stranger" | Stray Kids | Bang Chan; Changbin; Han | Bang Chan; Changbin; Han; Hong Ji-sang | Hong Ji-sang | Pop Out Boy! OST Part 1 | 2020 | |
| "Hero's Soup" (해장국) | Stray Kids | Bang Chan; Changbin; Han | Bang Chan; Changbin; Han; Lee Hae-sol | Lee Hae-sol | I Am You | 2018 | |
| "Heyday" | Bang Chan; Changbin; Han | Bang Chan; Changbin; Han | Czaer; MarkAlong; Stephen Lee; Bashment YC; Owo; Bang Chan; Changbin; Han | Czaer; MarkAlong; Stephen Lee; Bashment YC; Owo; Bang Chan | Street Man Fighter Original Vol. 4 (Crew Songs) | 2022 | |
| "Hold My Hand" | Han | Han | Han; Helixx | Helixx | Hop | 2024 | |
| "Holiday" | Stray Kids | Bang Chan; Han | Bang Chan; Han; JVersachoi | Versachoi; Bang Chan | Do It | 2025 | |
| "Hollow"† | Stray Kids | Bang Chan; Changbin; Han; KM-Markit | Bang Chan; Changbin; Han; Versachoi | Versachoi | Hollow | 2025 | |
| "Hug Me" (안아줄게요) | I.N | I.N | I.N; Bang Chan; Nickko Young | Bang Chan; Nickko Young | SKZ-Replay | 2022 | |
| "I Am You" | Stray Kids | Bang Chan; Changbin; Han | Bang Chan; Changbin; Han; Lee Woo-min "Collapsedone"; Justin Reinstein; KZ; Zene The Zilla | Lee Woo-min "Collapsedone"; Justin Reinstein | I Am You; Unveil Stray Kids | 2018 | |
| "I Do" | Stray Kids | Changbin | Changbin; Restart; Chae Gang-hae | Restart; Chae Gang-hae | This & That | 2026 | |
| "I Got It" | Han | Han | Han; Bang Chan | Bang Chan | SKZ-Replay | 2020 | |
| "I Hate to Admit" (인정하기 싫어) | Bang Chan | Bang Chan | Bang Chan | Bang Chan | SKZ-Replay | 2020 | |
| "I Like It" | Stray Kids | Bang Chan; Changbin; Han; JBach | Bang Chan; Changbin; Han; Nathan Cunningham; Marc Sibley; JBach | Space Primates; Bang Chan | Ate | 2024 | |
| "Ice.Cream" | Hyunjin | Hyunjin | Hyunjin; Bang Chan | Bang Chan | SKZ-Replay | 2022 | |
| "In My Head" | Stray Kids | Bang Chan; Changbin | Bang Chan; Changbin; Jun2 | Jun2; Bang Chan | Karma | 2025 | |
| "In the Dark" | DJ Snake; Stray Kids | Nicolas Petitfrère; William Grigahcine; Ari PenSmith; Jenna Andrews; Nicholas Audino; Stephen Kirk; Bang Chan; Changbin; Han; Johannes Klahr; Richard Zastenker | | DJ Snake; Klahr; Liohn | Nomad | 2025 | |
| "Insomnia" (불면증) | Stray Kids | Bang Chan; Changbin; Han | Bang Chan; Changbin; Han; KZ; Space One | Space One | I Am Who | 2018 | |
| "Into the Current" (급류) | Seungmin | Han | Han; Neut | Neut | SKZ-Replay 2026 Pt.1 | 2026 | |
| "Item" | Stray Kids | Bang Chan; Changbin; Han | Bang Chan; Changbin; Han; Versachoi | Versachoi; Bang Chan | 5-Star | 2023 | |
| "Jjam" | Stray Kids | Bang Chan; Changbin | Bang Chan; Changbin; Restart; Chae Gang-hae | Restart; Chae Gang-hae; Bang Chan | Ate | 2024 | |
| "Just a Little" | Stray Kids | Han; KM-Markit | Han; Bang Chan | Bang Chan; Millionboy | Hollow | 2025 | |
| "Lalalala" (락 (樂)) | Stray Kids | Bang Chan; Changbin; Han | Bang Chan; Changbin; Han; Versachoi; Kevin Gomringer; Tim Gomringer; Luis Bacque | Versachoi; Bang Chan; Cubeatz (Nickko Young) (Note: Nickko Young is credited only on the rock version) | Rock-Star | 2023 | |
| "Last Take" | Stray Kids | Han; Elvyn | Han; Restart; Chae Gang-hae | Restart; Chae Gang-hae | Suiatsu | 2026 | |
| "Leave" | Stray Kids | Bang Chan; Changbin | Bang Chan; Changbin; Jun2 | Jun2; Bang Chan | Rock-Star | 2023 | |
| "Levanter" (바람; 風)‡ | Stray Kids | Bang Chan; Changbin; Han; J.Y. Park "The Asiansoul"; Herz Analog (KM-Markit) | Bang Chan; Changbin; Han; Hong Ji-sang | Hong Ji-sang | Clé: Levanter; Step Out of Clé; SKZ2020 | 2019 | |
| "Like Magic" | J.Y. Park; Stray Kids; Itzy; Nmixx | J.Y. Park "The Asiansoul"; Deza; Hadar Adora; Changbin | J.Y. Park "The Asiansoul"; Deza; Hadar Adora; Lee Hae-sol | J.Y. Park "The Asiansoul"; Lee Hae-sol | Non-album single | 2024 | |
| "Limbo" (나지막이) | Lee Know | Lee Know; HotSauce | Lee Know; HotSauce | HotSauce | SKZ-Replay | 2022 | |
| "The Little Things" (행복 뭐 별거 없네요) | I.N | Han | Han; Restart; Chae Gang-hae | Restart; Chae Gang-hae | SKZ-Replay 2026 Pt.1 | 2026 | |
| "Lonely St." | Stray Kids | Bang Chan; Changbin | Bang Chan; Changbin; Jun2 | Jun2; Bang Chan | Oddinary | 2022 | |
| "Lonely Night" | Stray Kids | Han; KM-Markit | Han; Bang Chan | Bang Chan; Versachoi | Suiatsu | 2026 | |
| "Lose My Breath" | Stray Kids featuring Charlie Puth | Charlie Puth; Jacob Kasher Hindlin; Bang Chan; Changbin; Han | Charlie Puth; Bang Chan; Changbin; Han; Johnny Goldstein | Charlie Puth; Johnny Goldstein; Bang Chan | Non-album single | 2024 | |
| "Lost Me" | Stray Kids | Changbin; Sunny Boy | Changbin; Bang Chan; Versachoi | Bang Chan; Versachoi | The Sound | 2023 | |
| "Lover" | Hyunjin | Hyunjin | Hyunjin; Joha | Joha | SKZ-Replay 2026 Pt.1 | 2026 | |
| "#LoveStay" | Stray Kids | Hyunjin; Felix; I.N | Hyunjin; Semi Kim | Semi Kim; Bang Chan (3Racha) | SKZ-Replay | 2021 | |
| "Love Untold" | Hyunjin | Hyunjin | Hyunjin; Bang Chan | Bang Chan; Nickko Young | SKZ-Replay | 2022 | |
| "M.I.A." | Stray Kids | Bang Chan; Changbin; Han | Bang Chan; Changbin; Han; Kim Mong-e | Kim Mong-e; Bang Chan | I Am Who | 2018 | |
| "Maknae on Top" (막내온탑) | I.N featuring Bang Chan, Changbin | I.N; Changbin; Bang Chan | Bang Chan | Bang Chan | SKZ-Replay | 2021 | |
| "Maniac"† | Stray Kids | Bang Chan; Changbin; Han (KM-Markit) | Bang Chan; Changbin; Han; Versachoi | Versachoi; Bang Chan | Oddinary; Circus | 2022 | |
| "Maze of Memories" (잠깐의 고요) | Stray Kids | Bang Chan; Changbin; Han | Bang Chan; Changbin; Han; J;Key | J;Key; Bang Chan | Clé 1: Miroh | 2019 | |
| "Megaverse" | Stray Kids | Bang Chan; Changbin; Han | Bang Chan; Changbin; Han; Versachoi | Versachoi; Bang Chan | Rock-Star | 2023 | |
| "Mess" (엉망) | Stray Kids | Han; Bang Chan | Han; Bang Chan; Millionboy | Millionboy; Bang Chan | Karma | 2025 | |
| "Mic&Brush" | Hyunjin | Hyunjin | Hyunjin; Restart; Chae Gang-hae | Restart; Chae Gang-hae | SKZ-Replay 2026 Pt.1 | 2026 | |
| "Miroh" | Stray Kids | Bang Chan; Changbin; Han | Bang Chan; Changbin; Han; Brian Atwood | Brian Atwood; Bang Chan | Clé 1: Miroh; Unveil Stray Kids | 2019 | |
| "Mirror" | Stray Kids | Bang Chan; Changbin; Han | Bang Chan; Changbin; Han; Lee Woo-min "Collapsedone"; Fredrik "Fredro" Ödesjö | Lee Woo-min "Collapsedone"; Fredrik "Fredro" Ödesjö | I Am Not | 2018 | |
| "Miss You" (꼬마별) | Hyunjin | Hyunjin | Hyunjin; Bush | Bush | SKZ-Replay | 2020 | |
| "Mixtape: Gone Days" | Stray Kids | Bang Chan | Bang Chan; Trippy | Giriboy; Minit | Go Live | 2019 | |
| "Mixtape: Oh" (애) | Stray Kids | Bang Chan; Changbin; Han | Bang Chan; Changbin; Han; Kobee; Holy M | Kobee; Holy M | Noeasy | 2021 | |
| "Mixtape: On Track" (바보라도 알아) | Stray Kids | Changbin; KZ; B.O. | Changbin; KZ; Taebongi; B.O. | KZ; Taebongi | Go Live | 2020 | |
| "Mixtape: Time Out" | Stray Kids | Bang Chan; Changbin; Han | Bang Chan; Changbin; Han; Versachoi; Jun2 | Versachoi; Bang Chan; Jun2 | 5-Star | 2022 | |
| "Mixtape#1" / "Placebo" | Stray Kids | Bang Chan; Woojin (Note: Woojin is not credited on SKZ2021 version.); Lee Know; Changbin; Hyunjin; Han; Felix; Seungmin; I.N | Bang Chan; Changbin; Han; Woojin | Lee Woo-min "Collapsedone" | I Am Not; Clé 2: Yellow Wood; SKZ2021 | 2018 | |
| "Mixtape#2" / "Behind the Light" (그림자도 빛이 있어야 존재) | Stray Kids | Bang Chan; Woojin; Lee Know; Changbin; Hyunjin; Han; Felix; Seungmin; I.N | Bang Chan; Woojin; Lee Know; Changbin; Hyunjin; Han; Felix; Seungmin; I.N | Bang Chan | I Am Who; Clé 2: Yellow Wood; SKZ2021 | 2018 | |
| "Mixtape#3" / "For You" | Stray Kids | Bang Chan; Woojin; Lee Know; Changbin; Hyunjin; Han; Felix; Seungmin; I.N | Bang Chan; Woojin; Lee Know; Changbin; Hyunjin; Han; Felix; Seungmin; I.N | Bang Chan; Doplamingo | I Am You; Clé 2: Yellow Wood; SKZ2021 | 2018 | |
| "Mixtape#4" / "Broken Compass" (고장난 나침반) | Stray Kids | Bang Chan; Woojin; Lee Know; Changbin; Hyunjin; Han; Felix; Seungmin; I.N | Bang Chan; Woojin; Lee Know; Changbin; Hyunjin; Han; Felix; Seungmin; I.N | Versachoi; Bang Chan | Clé 1: Miroh; Clé 2: Yellow Wood; SKZ2021 | 2019 | |
| "Mixtape#5" / "Hoodie Season" | Stray Kids | Bang Chan; Lee Know; Changbin; Hyunjin; Han; Felix; Seungmin; I.N | Bang Chan; Lee Know; Changbin; Hyunjin; Han; Felix; Seungmin; I.N | Edmmer; Alom | Clé: Levanter; SKZ2021 | 2019 | |
| "Mountains" | Stray Kids | Bang Chan; Changbin; Han | Bang Chan; Changbin; Han; Versachoi | Versachoi; Bang Chan | Ate | 2024 | |
| "Muddy Water" | Changbin; Hyunjin; Han; Felix | Changbin; Hyunjin; Han; Felix | Changbin; Hyunjin; Han; Felix; Millionboy | Millionboy; Bang Chan | Oddinary | 2022 | |
| "My Name" (명) | Changbin | Changbin | Changbin; Restart; Chae Gang-hae | Restart; Chae Gang-hae | SKZ-Replay 2026 Pt.1 | 2026 | |
| "My Pace"† | Stray Kids | Bang Chan; Changbin; Han; J.Y. Park "The Asiansoul" (Note: Signifies an additional lyricist) (KM-Markit) | Bang Chan; Changbin; Han; Earattack; Larmook | Earattack; Larmook; Gongdo | I Am Who; Unveil Stray Kids; SKZ2020 | 2018 | |
| "My Side" (편) | Stray Kids | Bang Chan; Changbin; Han | Bang Chan; Changbin; Han; Frants | Frants | I Am You | 2018 | |
| "My Universe" | Seungmin; I.N featuring Changbin | Iggy; Ung Kim; Changbin; Seungmin; I.N | Iggy; Ung Kim | Ung Kim | In Life | 2020 | |
| "N/S" (극과 극) | Stray Kids | Bang Chan; Changbin; Han | Bang Chan; Changbin; Han; Slo | Slo | I Am You | 2018 | |
| "Never Alone" | Stray Kids | Bang Chan; Changbin; Han; Yohei | Bang Chan; Changbin; Han; Versachoi | Versachoi; Bang Chan | Hollow | 2025 | |
| "Neverending Story" (끝나지 않을 이야기) | Stray Kids | Park Se-joon; Taibian; Changbin | Taibian; Baaq; CHKmate | Taibian; Baaq; CHKmate; Jung Wan-ki | Extraordinary You OST | 2019 | |
| "Night"‡ | Stray Kids | Bang Chan; Changbin; Han (D&H) (Sophia Pae) | Bang Chan; Changbin; Han; Versachoi | Versachoi | Giant | 2024 | |
| "Not!" | Stray Kids | Bang Chan | Bang Chan; Hong Ji-sang | Hong Ji-sang | I Am Not | 2018 | |
| "Novel" | Stray Kids | Seungmin; KM-Markit | Seungmin; Bang Chan; Nickko Young | Bang Chan; Nickko Young | The Sound | 2023 | |
| "November 11th" (11월 11일) | Stray Kids | Han | Han; Helixx; Peach.L | Helixx | Non-album single | 2026 | |
| "One Day" | Stray Kids | Changbin; Lee Joon-seok; KM-Markit | Changbin; Bang Chan; Lee Joon-seok | Bang Chan; Lee Joon-seok | All In | 2020 | |
| "Pacemaker" | Stray Kids | Bang Chan; Changbin; Han; Jinri (Full8loom) | Bang Chan; Changbin; Han; Jinri (Full8loom); Glory Face (Full8loom); Jake (ARTiffect) | Glory Face (Full8loom); Jake (ARTiffect) | Go Live | 2020 | |
| "Parade" | Stray Kids | Bang Chan; Changbin; Han; KM-Markit | Bang Chan; Changbin; Han; Millionboy | Millionboy; Bang Chan | Hollow | 2025 | |
| "Party's Not Over" | Stray Kids | Changbin; Restart; Seungmin | Changbin; Restart; Chae Gang-hae | Restart; Chae Gang-hae | SKZ-Record and SKZ-Player track | 2023 | |
| "Perfume" | Seungmin | Restart; Seungmin | Restart; Seungmin; Chae Gang-hae | Chae Gang-hae; Restart | SKZ-Replay 2026 Pt.1 | 2026 | |
| "Phobia" | Stray Kids | Bang Chan; Changbin; Han; Versachoi | Versachoi; Albin Nordqvist | Versachoi | Go Live | 2020 | |
| "Phoenix" | Stray Kids | Bang Chan; Changbin; Han | Bang Chan; Changbin; Han; Ronnie Icon; DallasK | DallasK; Bang Chan | Karma | 2025 | |
| "Photobook" | Stray Kids | Bang Chan; Changbin; Han | Bang Chan; Changbin; Han; Nickko Young | Nickko Young | Do It | 2025 | |
| "Piece of a Puzzle" (조각) | Changbin; Seungmin | Changbin; Seungmin | Changbin; Seungmin; Bang Chan | Bang Chan | SKZ-Replay | 2021 | |
| "Question" | Stray Kids | Bang Chan; Changbin; Han | Bang Chan; Changbin; Han; HotSauce | HotSauce | I Am Who | 2018 | |
| "Railway" | Bang Chan | Bang Chan | Bang Chan; Versachoi | Versachoi; Bang Chan | Hop | 2024 | |
| "Raining Stars" (유성우) | Han | Han | Han; Helixx | Helixx | SKZ-Replay 2026 Pt.1 | 2026 | |
| "Red Lights" (강박) | Bang Chan; Hyunjin | Bang Chan; Hyunjin | Bang Chan; Hyunjin | Bang Chan; Versachoi | Noeasy | 2021 | |
| "Rev It Up" | Felix | Felix | Felix; Bang Chan; Versachoi | Bang Chan; Versachoi | SKZ-Replay 2026 Pt.1 | 2026 | |
| "Road Not Taken" (밟힌 적 없는 길) | Stray Kids | Bang Chan; Changbin; Han | Matthew Tishler; Andrew Underberg; Crash Cove | Matthew Tishler; Crash Cove | Clé 2: Yellow Wood | 2019 | |
| "Rock" (돌) | Stray Kids | Bang Chan; Changbin; Han | Bang Chan; Changbin; Han; Glory Face (Full8loom) | Glory Face (Full8loom) | I Am Not | 2018 | |
| "Run" | Han | Han | Han; Bang Chan | Bang Chan | SKZ-Replay | 2022 | |
| "Roman Empire" | Bang Chan | Bang Chan | Bang Chan; Taalthechoi | Taalthechoi; Bang Chan | SKZ-Replay 2026 Pt.1 | 2026 | |
| "Run It" | Stray Kids | Bang Chan; Changbin; Han; Marcus Lomax | Bang Chan; Changbin; Han; Marcus Lomax; Versachoi | Versachoi; Bang Chan | This & That | 2026 | |
| "Runners" | Stray Kids | Bang Chan; Felix | Bang Chan; Felix; Versachoi | Versachoi | Ate | 2024 | |
| "S-Class" (특) | Stray Kids | Bang Chan; Changbin; Han | Bang Chan; Changbin; Han; Chae Gang-hae; Restart | Bang Chan; Chae Gang-hae; Restart | 5-Star | 2023 | |
| "Saiyan" | Stray Kids | Han; Bang Chan; KM-Markit | Han; Bang Chan; Versachoi | Bang Chan; Versachoi | Giant | 2024 | |
| Scars"† | Stray Kids | Bang Chan; Changbin; Han (KM-Markit) | Armadillo; Bang Chan; Changbin; Han | Bang Chan; Versachoi | SKZ2021; The Sound | 2021 | |
| "School Life" | Stray Kids | Bang Chan; Changbin; Han; Woojin; I.N; This N That | Brandon P. Lowry; Tobias Karlsson; Matthew Engst; Han; Woojin; Sangmi Kim | Brandon P. Lowry; Tobias Karlsson; Matthew Engst; Sangmi Kim | Mixtape | 2018 | |
| "Secret Secret" (말할 수 없는 비밀) | Stray Kids | Han | JinbyJin; Han; Moa "Cazzi Opeia" Carlebecker; Gabriel Brandes | JinbyJin | Noeasy | 2021 | |
| "Side Effects" (부작용) | Stray Kids | Bang Chan; Changbin; Han | Bang Chan; Changbin; Han; Tak; 1Take | Tak; 1Take | Clé 2: Yellow Wood; Unveil Stray Kids | 2019 | |
| "Silent Cry"† | Stray Kids | Bang Chan; Changbin; Han (KM-Markit) | Bang Chan; Changbin; Han; Hong Ji-sang | Hong Ji-sang | Noeasy; Circus | 2021 | |
| "Slash" | Stray Kids | Bang Chan; Changbin; Han | Bang Chan; Changbin; Han; Versachoi | Bang Chan; Versachoi | Deadpool & Wolverine | 2024 | |
| "Slump"‡ | Stray Kids | Han (KM-Markit) | Han; Bang Chan | Bang Chan | Go Live; All In | 2020 | |
| "So Good" | Hyunjin | Hyunjin | Hyunjin; Joha | Joha | Hop | 2024 | |
| "Social Path"† | Stray Kids featuring Lisa | Bang Chan; Changbin; Han (Yohei) | Bang Chan; Changbin; Han; Versachoi | Versachoi | Social Path / Super Bowl (Japanese Ver.); Rock-Star | 2023 | |
| "Sorry, I Love You" (좋아해서 미안) | Stray Kids | Changbin | Changbin; Millionboy | Millionboy; Bang Chan | Noeasy | 2021 | |
| "The Sound" † | Stray Kids | Bang Chan; Changbin; Han; D&H | Bang Chan; Changbin; Han; Zack Djurich; Kyle Reynolds; Chris LaRocca | Bang Chan; Zack Djurich; Kyle Reynolds; Chris LaRocca | The Sound; 5-Star | 2023 | |
| "Spread My Wings" (어린 날개) | Stray Kids | Bang Chan; Changbin; Han | Bang Chan; Changbin; Han; Trippy | Trippy | Mixtape | 2018 | |
| "Ssick" (씩) | Stray Kids | Bang Chan; Changbin; Han | Bang Chan; Changbin; Han; ByHVN (153/Joombas) | ByHVN (153/Joombas); Bang Chan | Noeasy | 2021 | |
| "Star Lost" | Stray Kids | Bang Chan; Changbin; Han; Earattack; Carlos | Earattack; DaviDior | DaviDior; Earattack | Noeasy | 2021 | |
| "Stars and Raindrops" (내려요) | Seungmin | Seungmin; Hong Ji-sang | Seungmin; Hong Ji-sang | Hong Ji-sang | SKZ-Replay | 2022 | |
| "Stay" | Stray Kids | Seungmin; Han | Seungmin; Han; Millionboy; Younghood | Millionboy; Younghood | SKZ-Replay 2026 Pt.1 | 2026 | |
| "Still Here" (제자리걸음) | Seungmin | Changbin | Changbin; Millionboy; Nickko Young | Millionboy; Nickko Young | SKZ-Replay 2026 Pt.1 | 2026 | |
| "Stop" | Stray Kids | Bang Chan; Changbin; Han | Bang Chan; Changbin; Han; Matthew Tishler; Andrew Underberg; Crash Cove | Matthew Tishler; Crash Cove | Clé: Levanter | 2019 | |
| "Stray Kids" | Stray Kids | Bang Chan; Changbin; Han | Bang Chan; Changbin; Han; DallasK; Ronnie Icon | DallasK | Ate | 2024 | |
| "Streetlight" | Changbin featuring Bang Chan | Changbin | Changbin; Bang Chan | Bang Chan | SKZ-Replay | 2020 | |
| "Suiatsu" | Stray Kids | Bang Chan; Changbin; Han; Elvyn | Bang Chan; Changbin; Han; Nickko Young | Nickko Young; Bang Chan | Suiatsu | 2026 | |
| "Sunshine" | Stray Kids | Han | Han; Nick Lee; Josh Wei | Nick Lee; Josh Wei | Clé: Levanter | 2019 | |
| "Super Board" | Stray Kids | Bang Chan; Changbin; Han | Bang Chan; Changbin; Han; Kim Park Chella | Kim Park Chella; Bang Chan | Maxident | 2022 | |
| "Super Bowl"# | Stray Kids | Bang Chan; Changbin; Han; Felix (KM-Markit) | Bang Chan; Changbin; Han; Zack Djurich | Zack Djurich; Bang Chan | 5-Star; Social Path / Super Bowl (Japanese Ver.) | 2023 | |
| "Surfin'" | Changbin; Lee Know; Felix | Changbin; Lee Know; Felix | Changbin; Lee Know; Felix; Versachoi | Versachoi | Noeasy | 2021 | |
| "Ta" (타) | Stray Kids | Bang Chan; Changbin; Han | Bang Chan; Changbin; Han; Lee Hae-sol | Lee Hae-sol | Go Live | 2020 | |
| "Taste" | Lee Know; Hyunjin; Felix | Hyunjin; Felix; Lee Know | Hyunjin; Felix; Lee Know; Bang Chan | Bang Chan; Versachoi | Maxident | 2022 | |
| "Temple" | Stray Kids | Bang Chan; Changbin; Han; Elvyn | Bang Chan; Changbin; Han; Restart; Chae Gang-hae | Restart; Chae Gang-hae; Bang Chan | Suiatsu | 2026 | |
| "There" | Stray Kids | Bang Chan; Changbin | Bang Chan; Changbin; Jun2 | Jun2; Bang Chan | The Sound | 2023 | |
| "This & That" | Stray Kids | Bang Chan; Changbin; Han; Stefan Johnson; Jordan K. Johnson; Jackson Foote; Tele; Rayman; Isaiah Tejada | Bang Chan; Changbin; Han; Stefan Johnson; Jordan K. Johnson; Jackson Foote; Tele; Rayman; Isaiah Tejada | The Monsters & Strangerz; Tele; Rayman; Isaiah Tejada; Bang Chan | This & That | 2026 | |
| "Thunderous" (소리꾼; ソリクン)† | Stray Kids | Bang Chan; Changbin; Han (KM-Markit) | Bang Chan; Changbin; Han; HotSauce | HotSauce; Bang Chan | Noeasy; The Sound | 2021 | |
| "TMT" (별생각) | Stray Kids | Bang Chan; Changbin; Han | Bang Chan; Changbin; Han; Time; Gravvity | TIME; Grvvity | Clé 2: Yellow Wood | 2019 | |
| "Top"‡ | Stray Kids | Armadillo; Bang Chan; Changbin; Han (KM-Markit); Sophia Pae | Armadillo; Bang Chan; Changbin; Han; Rangga; Gwon Yeong-chan | Armadillo; Bang Chan; Rangga; Gwon Yeong-chan | Go Live; All In | 2020 | |
| "Topline" | Stray Kids featuring Tiger JK | Bang Chan; Changbin; Han; Tiger JK | Bang Chan; Changbin; Han; Versachoi | Versachoi | 5-Star | 2023 | |
| "Truman" | Han; Felix | Han; Felix | Vendors (Helixx); Peach.L; Han; Felix | Vendors (Helixx) | Mixtape: Dominate | 2025 | |
| "The Tortoise and the Hare" (토끼와 거북이) | Stray Kids | Bang Chan; Changbin; Han | Bang Chan; Changbin; Han; Amanda MNDR Warner; Peter Wade Keusch | Amanda MNDR Warner; Peter Wade Keusch | In Life | 2020 | |
| "Twilight" (또 다시 밤) | Stray Kids | Han | Han; Restart; Chae Gang-hae | Restart; Chae Gang-hae | Ate | 2024 | |
| "U" | Stray Kids featuring Tablo | Bang Chan; Changbin; Han; Tablo; JBach | Bang Chan; Changbin; Han; JBach; Marc Sibley; Nathan Cunningham | Space Primates; Bang Chan | Hop | 2024 | |
| "Ultra" | Changbin | Changbin | Changbin; Chae Gang-hae; Restart | Chae Gang-hae; Restart | Hop | 2024 | |
| "Unfair" | Felix | Felix | Versachoi; Felix | Versachoi | Hop | 2024 | |
| "Up All Night" (오늘 밤 나는 불을 켜) | Bang Chan; Changbin; Felix; Seungmin | Bang Chan; Changbin | Bang Chan; Nick Lee; Josh Wei | Nick Lee; Josh Wei; Bang Chan | SKZ-Replay | 2021 | |
| "Venom" (거미줄)† | Stray Kids | Bang Chan; Changbin; Han (Yohei) | Bang Chan; Changbin; Han; DallasK | DallasK; Bang Chan | Oddinary; Circus | 2022 | |
| "The View" | Stray Kids | Bang Chan; Changbin; Han; Krysta Youngs | Bang Chan; Changbin; Han; TELYKast; Krysta Youngs | TELYKast; Bang Chan | Noeasy | 2021 | |
| "Victory Song" (승전가) | Stray Kids | Bang Chan; Changbin; Han | Bang Chan; Changbin; Han; Earattack; Larmook | Earattack; Larmook | Clé 1: Miroh; Unveil Stray Kids | 2019 | |
| "Voices" | Stray Kids | Bang Chan; Changbin; Han | Bang Chan; Changbin; Han; Trippy | Trippy; Bang Chan | I Am Who | 2018 | |
| "Waiting for Us" (피어난다) | Bang Chan; Lee Know; Seungmin; I.N | Bang Chan; Lee Know; Seungmin; I.N | Bang Chan; Lee Know; Seungmin; I.N; Nickko Young | Nickko Young; Bang Chan | Oddinary | 2022 | |
| "Walkin on Water" | Stray Kids | Bang Chan; Changbin; Han | Bang Chan; Changbin; Han; Restart; Chae Gang-hae | Restart; Chae Gang-hae; Bang Chan | Hop | 2024 | |
| "Way Out" | Stray Kids | Bang Chan; Changbin | Bang Chan; Changbin; Jun2 | Jun2; Bang Chan | This & That | 2026 | |
| "We Go" | Bang Chan; Changbin; Han | Bang Chan; Changbin; Han | Bang Chan; Changbin; Han; Nick Furlong; DallasK | DallasK; Bang Chan | In Life | 2020 | |
| "Who?" | Stray Kids | Woojin; Han; Felix | Woojin; Han; Felix; Hong Ji-sang | Hong Ji-sang | I Am Who | 2018 | |
| "Why?" | Stray Kids | Bang Chan; Changbin; Han; D&H; Yohei | Bang Chan; Changbin; Han; Hong Ji-sang | Hong Ji-sang | Giant | 2024 | |
| "Winter Falls" | Stray Kids | Han | Han; Earattack | Earattack | Christmas EveL | 2021 | |
| "Wish You Back" | Han | Han | Han; Bang Chan | Bang Chan | SKZ-Replay | 2021 | |
| "Wolfgang" | Stray Kids | Bang Chan; Changbin; Han | Bang Chan; Changbin; Han; Versachoi | Versachoi; Bang Chan | Kingdom <Final: Who Is the King?> Noeasy | 2021 | |
| "Wow" | Lee Know; Hyunjin; Felix | Lee Know; Hyunjin; Felix; Kass | Christopher Worthly; Massimo Del Gaudio; Andreas Ringblom | Andreas Ringblom | In Life | 2020 | |
| "Yayaya" | Stray Kids | Bang Chan; Changbin; Han; Earattack | Earattack; Bang Chan; Changbin; Han | Earattack | Mixtape | 2018 | |
| "You Can Stay" | Stray Kids | Bang Chan; Changbin; Han | Bang Chan; Changbin; Han; Cook Classics | Cook Classics | Clé: Levanter | 2019 | |
| "You." | Stray Kids | Changbin; Hyunjin; I.N | Changbin; Hyunjin; I.N; Hong Ji-sang | Hong Ji-sang | I Am You | 2018 | |
| "Your Eyes" | Stray Kids | Bang Chan; Changbin; KM-Markit | Bang Chan; Changbin; Jun2 | Jun2 | Circus | 2022 | |
| "Youth" | Lee Know | Danke; Bang Hye-hyun; Lee Know | Chan's; Backbear (Take a Chance); Celotron (Decade+) | Chan's; Backbear | Hop | 2024 | |
| "Youtiful" | Stray Kids | Bang Chan | Bang Chan; Nickko Young | Nickko Young | 5-Star | 2023 | |
| "Zone" | Bang Chan; Changbin; Han | Bang Chan; Changbin; Han | Bang Chan; Changbin; Han | Bang Chan | SKZ-Replay | 2022 | |

== See also ==
- Stray Kids discography
