= SKZ2021 =

Compilation album by Stray Kids
- Released: December 23, 2021
- Studios: JYPE (Seoul); The Vibe (Seoul); In Grid (Seoul); 821 Sound (Seoul); U Productions (Seoul)
- Length: 51:16
- Languages: Korean; English
- Label: JYP
- Producers: 3Racha; Versachoi; Kim Park Chella; Glory Face (Full8loom); This N That; Lee Woo-min 'Collapsedone'; Space One; Frants; Slo; Hong Ji-sang; Doplamingo; J;Key; Edmmer; Alom

Stray Kids chronology
Christmas EveL (2021)	SKZ2021 (2021)	Oddinary (2022)

Singles from SKZ2021
- 1. "Scars (Korean ver.)" Released: December 23, 2021

SKZ2021 is the second compilation album by South Korean boy band Stray Kids. It was released digitally on December 23, 2021, through JYP Entertainment. It consists of fourteen tracks that the group had released previously, but re-recorded versions consisting of their current lineup, which were not included in their previous compilation album, SKZ2020 (2020), as well as the Korean version of "Scars", which serves as its lead single.

== Background and release ==
Following the departure of Woojin from Stray Kids in late October 2019, the group released their first compilation album SKZ2020 on March 18, 2020, as the group's Japanese debut. SKZ2020 consists of 27 tracks of the 8-member re-recorded version of several previous songs since their pre-debut EP Mixtape (2018), and the singles "My Pace", "Double Knot", and "Levanter" recorded in Japanese. On January 1, 2021, the group uploaded the video Step Out 2021, containing the group's achievements in 2020, and to-do plans of 2021, including their upcoming SKZ2021, which and highlighted the title of the tracks not included on the previous SKZ2020.

Almost a year after uploading Step Out 2021, on December 21, the group uploaded a poster to announce SKZ2021 would be released on December 23 at 6:00 PM KST to digital music and streaming platform only. The complete track listing was revealed on the next day, consisting of thirteen of the previous-release tracks from the debut EP I Am Not (2018) to the sixth EP Clé: Levanter (2019), including the CD-exclusive tracks, titled "Mixtape", which use the original title instead, as well as "Scars", the group's second Japanese single recorded in Korean. The special music video of "Placebo", stated that it was made by the group's alter ego as SKZ Company personnel from their online program SKZ Code, was released on December 24.

== Commercial performance ==
In Japan, SKZ2021 entered Oricon Digital Albums Chart at number five with 959 download units, as well as Billboard Japan Hot Albums at number 40, selling 955 downloads, debuted at number four on the component Download Albums. The lead single "Scars (Korean ver.)" reached number 114 on the Gaon Download Chart, while the track "Hoodie Season" number 39 on the Hungarian Single Top 40 Chart.

== Track listing ==
SKZ2021 track listing
No.	Title	Lyrics	Music	Arrangement	Length
1.	"Scars" (Korean version)	Bang Chan (3Racha); Changbin (3Racha); Han (3Racha)	Bang Chan; Changbin; Han; Armadillo	Bang Chan; Versachoi	3:19
2.	"Awaken" (from I Am Not, 2018)	Bang Chan; Changbin; Han	Bang Chan; Changbin; Han; Kim Park Chella	Kim Park Chella; Bang Chan	3:13
3.	"Rock" (돌; from I Am Not, 2018)	Bang Chan; Changbin; Han	Bang Chan; Changbin; Han; Glory Face (Full8loom)	Glory Face	3:13
4.	"3rd Eye" (from I Am Not, 2018)	Bang Chan; Changbin; Han	Bang Chan; Changbin; Han; This N That	This N That	4:03
5.	"Placebo" (from I Am Not, 2018)	Bang Chan; Lee Know; Changbin; Hyunjin; Han; Felix; Seungmin; I.N	Bang Chan; Changbin; Han	Lee Woo-min 'Collapsedone'	3:55
6.	"Insomnia" (불면증; from I Am Who, 2018)	Bang Chan; Changbin; Han	Bang Chan; Changbin; Han; KZ; Space One	Space One	3:26
7.	"Behind the Light" (그림자도 빛이 있어야 존재; from I Am Who, 2018)	Bang Chan; Lee Know; Changbin; Hyunjin; Han; Felix; Seungmin; I.N	Bang Chan; Lee Know; Changbin; Hyunjin; Han; Felix; Seungmin; I.N	Bang Chan	4:30
8.	"My Side" (편; from I Am You, 2018)	Bang Chan; Changbin; Han	Bang Chan; Changbin; Han; Frants	Frants	3:36
9.	"N/S" (극과 극; from I Am You, 2018)	Bang Chan; Changbin; Han	Bang Chan; Changbin; Han; Slo	Slo	3:44
10.	"0325" (from I Am You, 2018)	Bang Chan; Changbin; Han	Bang Chan; Changbin; Han; Hong Ji-sang	Hong Ji-sang	3:38
11.	"For You" (from I Am You, 2018)	Bang Chan; Lee Know; Changbin; Hyunjin; Han; Felix; Seungmin; I.N	Bang Chan; Lee Know; Changbin; Hyunjin; Han; Felix; Seungmin; I.N	Bang Chan; Doplamingo	4:09
12.	"Maze of Memories" (잠깐의 고요; from Clé 1: Miroh, 2019)	Bang Chan; Changbin; Han	Bang Chan; Changbin; Han; J;Key	J;Key; Bang Chan	2:55
13.	"Broken Compass" (고장난 나침반; from Clé 1: Miroh, 2019)	Bang Chan; Lee Know; Changbin; Hyunjin; Han; Felix; Seungmin; I.N	Bang Chan; Lee Know; Changbin; Hyunjin; Han; Felix; Seungmin; I.N	Versachoi; Bang Chan	3:41
14.	"Hoodie Season" (from Clé: Levanter, 2019)	Bang Chan; Lee Know; Changbin; Hyunjin; Han; Felix; Seungmin; I.N	Bang Chan; Lee Know; Changbin; Hyunjin; Han; Felix; Seungmin; I.N	Edmmer; Alom	3:54
Total length:					51:16

Notes

- "Placebo", "Behind the Light", "For You", "Broken Compass", and "Hoodie Season", which are an original title, titled "Mixtape#1", "Mixtape#2", "Mixtape#3", "Mixtape#4", and "Mixtape#5", respectively on its original included EP.

== Credits and personnel ==
Credits adapted from Melon.

Musicians

- Stray Kids – lead vocals (all)
  - Bang Chan (3Racha) – background vocals (except 9, 14), lyrics (all), composition (all), arrangement (1, 2, 7, 11, 12, 13), computer programming (1, 2, 7, 12), instrumentation (13)
  - Changbin (3Racha) – background vocals (1, 6, 7, 10), lyrics (all), composition (all)
  - Han (3Racha) – background vocals (except 6, 8, 9, 12, 13, 14), lyrics (all), composition (all)
  - Lee Know – background vocals (5, 7), lyrics (5, 7, 11, 13, 14), composition (7, 11, 13, 14)
  - Hyunjin – background vocals (6, 7), lyrics (5, 7, 11, 13, 14), composition (7, 11, 13, 14)
  - Felix – background vocals (1, 7), lyrics (5, 7, 11, 13, 14), composition (7, 11, 13, 14)
  - Seungmin – background vocals (1, 5, 7, 8, 13), lyrics (5, 7, 11, 13, 14), composition (7, 11, 13, 14)
  - I.N – background vocals (7), lyrics (5, 7, 11, 13, 14), composition (7, 11, 13, 14)
- Armadillo – composition (1)
- Versachoi – arrangement (1, 13), instrumentation (13), computer programming (1, 13)
- Kim Park Chella – background vocals (2), composition (2), arrangement (2), computer programming (2), guitar (2), bass (2), keyboard (2), drum programming (2)
- Glory Face (Full8loom) (Jang Jun-ho) – composition (3), arrangement (3), instrumentation (3)
- This N That – composition (4), arrangement (4), computer programming (4), piano (4), synthesizer (4)
- Lee Woo-min 'Collapsedone' – arrangement (5), computer programming (5), synthesizer (5), piano (5), bass (5)
- KZ – background vocals (6), composition (6), MIDI programming (6), electric piano (6), bass (6)
- Space One – composition (6), arrangement (6), MIDI programming (6), piano (6), bass (6)
- Lee Seung-han – background vocals (6)
- Jukjae – guitar (7)
- Frants – composition (8), arrangement (8), computer programming (8), guitar (8), keyboard (8), synthesizer (8), drum programming (8)
- Slo – composition (9), arrangement (9), computer programming (9), synthesizer (9), drum programming (9), flute programming (9), bass programming (9)
- Hong Ji-sang – composition (10), arrangement (10), computer programming (10), guitar (10), keyboard (10), drum programming (10)
- Doplamingo – arrangement (11), computer programming (11), acoustic guitar (11), keyboard (11), drum programming (11), bass (11)
- Sojun – acoustic guitar (11), electric guitar (11)
- Cash Pie – electric guitar (11)
- J;Key – composition (12), arrangement (12), piano (12), bass (12), synthesizer (12), computer programming (12)
- Edmmer – arrangement (14), instrumentation (14)
- Alom – arrangement (14), instrumentation (14)

Technical

- Bang Chan (3Racha) – digital editing (1)
- Glory Face (Full8loom) (Jang Jun-ho) – digital editing (3)
- This N That – digital editing (4)
- Yue – vocal editing (4, 8, 11, 14), additional vocal editing (5, 7, 9)
- KZ – vocal editing (6)
- Kim Hye-kwang – vocal editing (6)
- Hong Ji-sang – vocal editing (10)
- Jiyoung Shin NYC – additional editing (5, 7)
- Edmmer – sound design (14)
- Alom – sound design (14)
- Choi Hye-jin – recording (1, 2, 3, 4), additional recording (4, 6, 7, 10), mixing (3)
- Kwak Jeong-shin – recording (3, 7, 8)
- Jung Mo-yeon – recording (3, 7, 8)
- Jung Eun-kyung – recording (4)
- Woo Min-jung – recording (4)
- Eom Se-hee – recording (4), mixing (4), mixing assistant (13)
- Noh Min-ji – recording (5, 6)
- Hong Eun-yi – recording (7, 8)
- Lim Hong-jin – recording (9), mixing (4, 6, 7, 13, 14)
- Jang Han-soo (JYPE Studio) – recording (10, 11)
- Kim Min-hee – recording (12, 14)
- Lee Sang-yeop – recording (13), additional recording (3, 5, 7, 8, 9, 11, 13)
- Lee Kyung-won – additional recording (12)
- Lee Tae-sub – mixing (1, 3, 6, 7)
- Nahzam Sue – mixing (2)
- Yoon Won-kwon – mixing (5)
- Cliff Lin – mixing (8)
- Jang Han-soo (Looda Sound) – mixing (9, 11, 12)
- Shin Bong-won – mixing (10)
- Kwon Nam-woo – mastering (1, 12, 13)
- Park Jeong-eon – mastering (except 1, 12, 13)

Locations

- JYP Publishing (KOMCA) – original publishing (all), sub-publishing (5)
- Copyright Control – original publishing (except 1, 5, 7, 8, 10, 13)
- Hybe – original publishing (8)
- Kwang Sound – vocal editing (6)
- JYPE Studios – recording (1, 2, 3, 4, 5, 6), additional recording (except 1, 2, 13), mixing (1, 3, 4, 6, 7, 9, 11)
- The Vibe Studio – recording (3, 7, 8, 9, 10, 11, 13)
- In Grid Studio – recording (4)
- 821 Sound – recording (12, 14), mastering (1, 12, 13)
- U Productions – additional recording (12)
- Wormwood Hill Studio – mixing (2)
- Studio DDeepKick – mixing (5)
- Glab Studio – mixing (10)
- Nonhyeon-dong Studio – mixing (13)
- RCAVE Sound – mixing (14)
- Honey Butter Studio – mastering (except 1, 12, 13)

== Charts ==
Chart performance for SKZ2021
Chart (2021)	Peak position
Japanese Digital Albums (Oricon)	5
Japanese Hot Albums (Billboard Japan)	40

== Sales ==
Sales figures for SKZ2021
Region	Certification	Certified units/sales
Japan Digital	—	959

== Release history ==
Release dates and formats for SKZ2021
Region	Date	Format	Label	Ref.
Various	December 23, 2021	Digital download; streaming	JYP	
