= SKZ2020 =

- Regular edition and digital cover

Compilation album by Stray Kids
- Released: March 18, 2020
- Length: 90:29
- Language: Japanese; Korean; English
- Label: Epic Japan; JYP
- Producer: 3Racha; Hong Ji-sang; DallasK; Earattack; Lamook; Gongdo; Armadillo; Rangga; Trippy; Lee Woo-min "Collapsedone"; Fredrik "Fredro" Ödesjö; HotSauce; Kim Mong-e; Time; Justin Reinstein; Yong Jong-sung (MonoTree); Song Ha-eun; Brian Atwood; Glory Face (Full8loom); Jake K (Artiffect); Kairos; SamUIL; K.O; Chan; Tak1; Take; Grvvity; Lorenzo Cosi; YK Koi

Stray Kids chronology
Step Out of Clé (2020)	SKZ2020 (2020)	Go Live (2020)

Singles from SKZ2020
- 1. "My Pace (Japanese ver.)" Released: January 31, 2020; 2. "Double Knot (Japanese ver.)" Released: February 18, 2020; 3. "Levanter (Japanese ver.)" Released: March 9, 2020

SKZ2020 is the first compilation album by South Korean boy band Stray Kids. It was released on March 18, 2020, through Epic Records Japan, and JYP Entertainment, as the group's Japanese debut release. This consists of twenty-seven tracks that the group had released previously, but re-recorded versions consisting of their current lineup, following the departure of Woojin from the group in late October 2019.

SKZ2020 preceded by the Japanese version of "My Pace", "Double Knot", and "Levanter". In Japan, the album was released physically in four versions: first press limited, regular, period time limited, and complete limited edition (cassette tape). SKZ2020 debuted at number three on both the Oricon Albums Chart, and the Billboard Japan Hot Albums, selling 36,347 copies in Japan as of March 2020. In the United States, the album entered the Billboard World Albums at number fourteen, selling 1,000 units in its first week.

== Track listing ==
First press limited and regular edition – CD, digital download, streaming
No.	Title	Lyrics	Music	Arrangement	Length
1.	"Levanter" (風; Japanese version)	Bang Chan (3Racha); Changbin (3Racha); Han (3Racha); J.Y. Park "The Asiansoul"; Herz Analog; KM-Markit	Bang Chan; Changbin; Han; Hong Ji-sang	Bang Chan; Changbin; Han; Hong	3:17
2.	"Double Knot" (Japanese version)	Bang Chan; Changbin; Han; KM-Markit	Bang Chan; Changbin; Han; Nick Furlong; DallasK	DallasK; Bang Chan	3:11
3.	"My Pace" (Japanese version)	Bang Chan; Changbin; Han; KM-Markit; Park^{[a]}	Bang Chan; Changbin; Han; Earattack; Larmook	Earattack; Larmook; Gongdo	3:11
4.	"Hellevator" (from Mixtape, 2018)	Armadillo; Bang Chan; Changbin; Han	Armadillo; Bang Chan; Changbin; Han; Rangga	Armadillo; Bang Chan; Rangga	3:59
5.	"Beware" (Grrr 총량의 법칙; from Mixtape, 2018)	Bang Chan; Changbin; Han	Bang Chan; Changbin; Han; Trippy; 1take	Trippy	3:10
6.	"Spread My Wings" (어린 날개; from Mixtape, 2018)	Bang Chan; Changbin; Han	Bang Chan; Changbin; Han; Trippy	Trippy	3:22
7.	"Yayaya" (from Mixtape, 2018)	Bang Chan; Changbin; Han; Earattack	Earattack; Bang Chan; Changbin; Han	Earattack	3:21
8.	"District 9" (from I Am Not, 2018)	Bang Chan; Changbin; Han	Bang Chan; Changbin; Han; Trippy	Trippy; Bang Chan	3:33
9.	"Mirror" (from I Am Not, 2018)	Bang Chan; Changbin; Han	Bang Chan; Changbin; Han; Lee Woo-min "Collapsedone"; Fredrik "Fredro" Ödesjö	Collapsedone; Ödesjö	3:42
10.	"Grow Up" (잘 하고 있어; from I Am Not, 2018)	Bang Chan; Changbin; Han	Bang Chan; Changbin; Han; Trippy	Trippy; Bang Chan	3:33
11.	"My Pace" (from I Am Who, 2018)	Bang Chan; Changbin; Han; Park^{[a]}	Bang Chan; Changbin; Han; Earattack; Larmook	Earattack; Larmook; Gongdo	3:10
12.	"Voices" (from I Am Who, 2018)	Bang Chan; Changbin; Han	Bang Chan; Changbin; Han; Trippy	Trippy; Bang Chan	3:22
13.	"Question" (from I Am Who, 2018)	Bang Chan; Changbin; Han	Bang Chan; Changbin; Han; HotSauce	HotSauce	3:04
14.	"M.I.A." (from I Am Who, 2018)	Bang Chan; Changbin; Han	Bang Chan; Changbin; Han; Kim Mung-i	Kim Mong-e; Bang Chan	3:31
15.	"Awkward Silence" (갑자기 분위기 싸해질 필요 없잖아요; from I Am Who, 2018)	Bang Chan; Changbin; Han	Bang Chan; Changbin; Han; Time	Time	3:15
16.	"I Am You" (from I Am You, 2018)	Bang Chan; Changbin; Han	Bang Chan; Changbin; Han; Collapsedone; Justin Reinstein; KZ; Zene the Zilla	Collapsedone; Reinstein	3:26
17.	"Get Cool" (from I Am You, 2018)	Bang Chan; Changbin; Han; Inner Child (MonoTree)	Yong Jong-sung (MonoTree); Inner Child; Song Ha-eun; Totem; Bang Chan; Changbin; Han	Yong Jong-sung; Song Ha-eun	3:16
18.	"Miroh" (from Clé 1: Miroh, 2019)	Bang Chan; Changbin; Han	Bang Chan; Changbin; Han; Brian Atwood	Atwood; Bang Chan	3:28
19.	"Victory Song" (승전가; from Clé 1: Miroh, 2019)	Bang Chan; Changbin; Han	Bang Chan; Changbin; Han; Earattack; Larmook	Earattack; Larmook	3:18
20.	"Boxer" (from Clé 1: Miroh, 2019)	Bang Chan; Changbin; Han	Bang Chan; Changbin; Han; Glory Face (Full8loom); Jake K (Artiffect)	Glory Face; Jake K	3:22
21.	"Chronosaurus" (from Clé 1: Miroh, 2019)	Bang Chan; Changbin; Han	Bang Chan; Kairos; SamUIL	Kairos; SamUIL; K.O	3:20
22.	"19" (from Clé 1: Miroh, 2019)	Han	Bang Chan; Han	Chan	3:26
23.	"Side Effects" (부작용; from Clé 2: Yellow Wood, 2019)	Bang Chan; Changbin; Han	Bang Chan; Changbin; Han; Tak; 1Take	Tak; 1Take	3:15
24.	"TMT" (별생각; from Clé 2: Yellow Wood, 2019)	Bang Chan; Changbin; Han	Bang Chan; Changbin; Han; Time; Grvvity	Time; Grvvity	3:29
25.	"Double Knot" (from Clé: Levanter, 2019)	Bang Chan; Changbin; Han	Bang Chan; Changbin; Han; Furlong; DallasK	DallasK; Bang Chan	3:11
26.	"Levanter" (바람; from Clé: Levanter, 2019)	Bang Chan; Changbin; Han; Park; Analog	Bang Chan; Changbin; Han; Hong	Hong	3:17
27.	"Astronaut" (from Clé: Levanter, 2019)	Bang Chan; Changbin; Han	Bang Chan; Changbin; Han; Lorenzo Cosi; YK Koi	Lorenzo Cosi; YK Koi	3:00
Total length:					90:29

First press limited edition – DVD
No.	Title	Director(s)	Length
1.	"Stray Kids Japan Showcase 2019 "Hi-Stay" Live"
2.	"Levanter" (Japanese version; music video)	Ziyong Kim (FantazyLab)	3:27
3.	"Levanter" (music video)	Ziyong Kim	3:27
4.	"Astronaut" (music video)	Pinklabel Visual	3:23

Period limited and complete limited edition – CD, cassette
No.	Title	Length
1.	"Levanter" (Japanese version)	3:17
2.	"Double Knot" (Japanese version)	3:11
3.	"My Pace" (Japanese version)	3:11
4.	"Hellevator"	3:59
5.	"District 9"	3:33
6.	"Grow Up"	3:33
7.	"My Pace"	3:10
8.	"I Am You"	3:26
9.	"Get Cool"	3:16
10.	"Miroh"	3:28
11.	"Victory Song"	3:18
12.	"Side Effects"	3:15
13.	"Double Knot"	3:11
14.	"Levanter"	3:17
Total length:		47:05

Notes

- ^{^[a]} Signifies an additional lyricist
- The album's CD package of first press limited and regular editions consists of two discs; one containing tracks 1–14, and the other with tracks 15–27.
- The Korean version of SKZ2020 ordered the Japanese version track to be the last three tracks, while the international version were not included, but released standalone instead.

== Charts ==
=== Weekly charts ===
Chart performance for SKZ2020
Chart (2020–2026)	Peak position
Hungarian Physical Albums (MAHASZ)	14
Japanese Albums (Oricon)	3
Japanese Hot Albums (Billboard Japan)	3
US World Albums (Billboard)	14

=== Monthly charts ===
Monthly chart performance for SKZ2020
Chart (2020)	Position
Japanese Albums (Oricon)	10

=== Year-end charts ===
Year-end chart performance for SKZ2020
Chart (2020)	Position
Japanese Albums (Oricon)	86
Japanese Hot Albums (Billboard Japan)	97

== Certifications ==
Certifications for SKZ2020
Region	Certification	Certified units/sales
Japan (RIAJ)	Gold	100,000^{^}
^{^} Shipments figures based on certification alone.

== Release history ==
Release history and formats for SKZ2020
Country	Date	Format	Label
Japan	March 18, 2020	CD, CD+DVD, digital download, streaming	Epic
Various	March 18, 2020	Digital download, streaming	JYP
