= I Am You =

I Am You may refer to:

- In Her Skin, a 2009 drama film known as I Am You from the working title How to Change in 9 Weeks
- I Am You (mixtape), a 2018 mixtape by YNW Melly
- I Am You (EP), a 2018 extended play by Stray Kids
  - "I Am You", the EP's title track

== See also ==
- I Am Yours (disambiguation)
- You Am I (disambiguation)
