= I.N =

South Korean singer (born 2001)

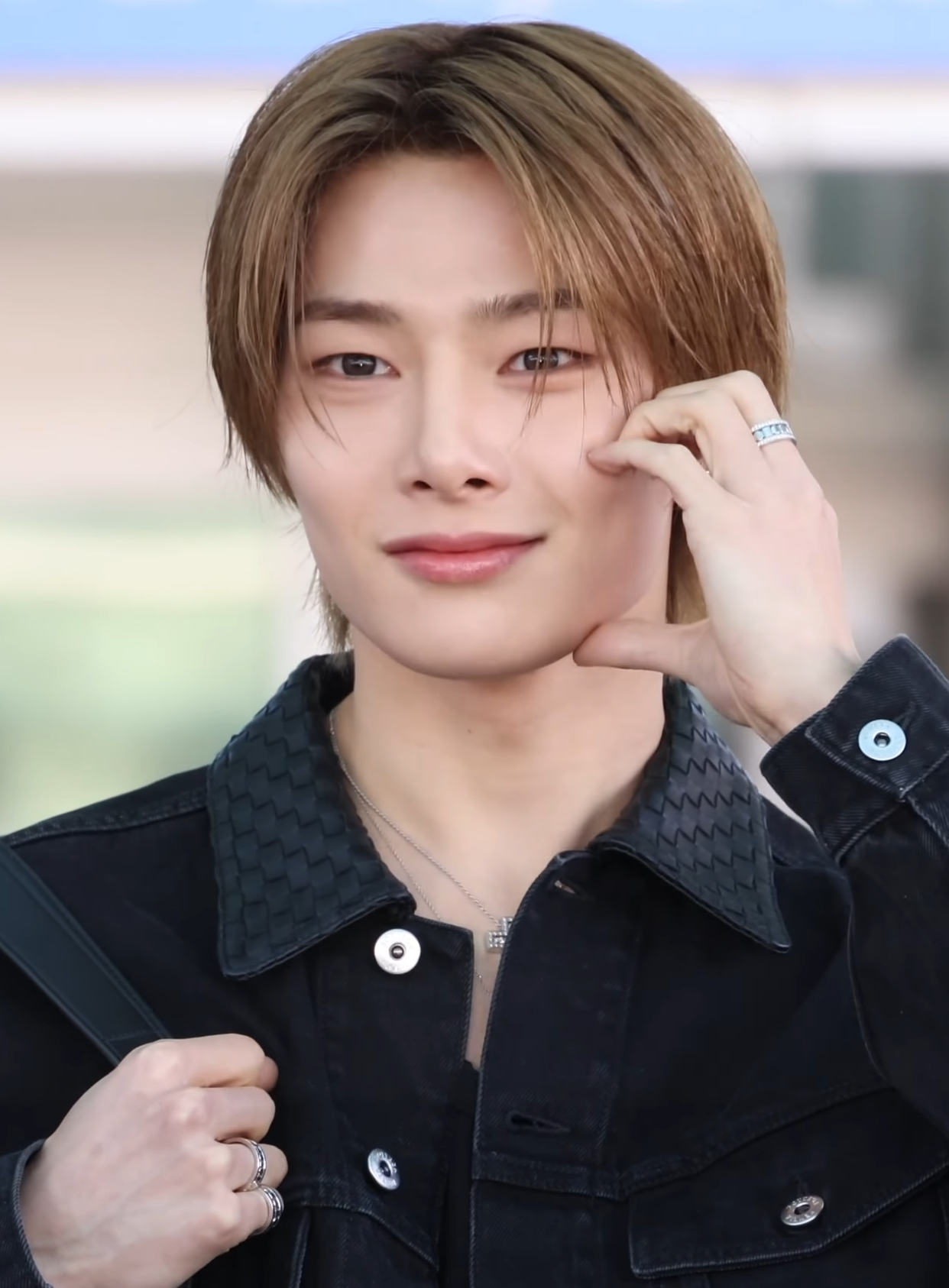
- I.N in February 2026
- Born: Yang Jeong-in; February 8, 2001 (age 25); Busan, South Korea
- Education: School of Performing Arts Seoul
- Occupation: Singer
- Years active: 2017–present
- Musical career
- Genres: K-pop; hip hop; electronica; EDM
- Instrument: Vocals
- Label: JYP
- Member of: Stray Kids

Korean name
- Hangul: 양정인
- RR: Yang Jeongin
- MR: Yang Chŏngin

Signature
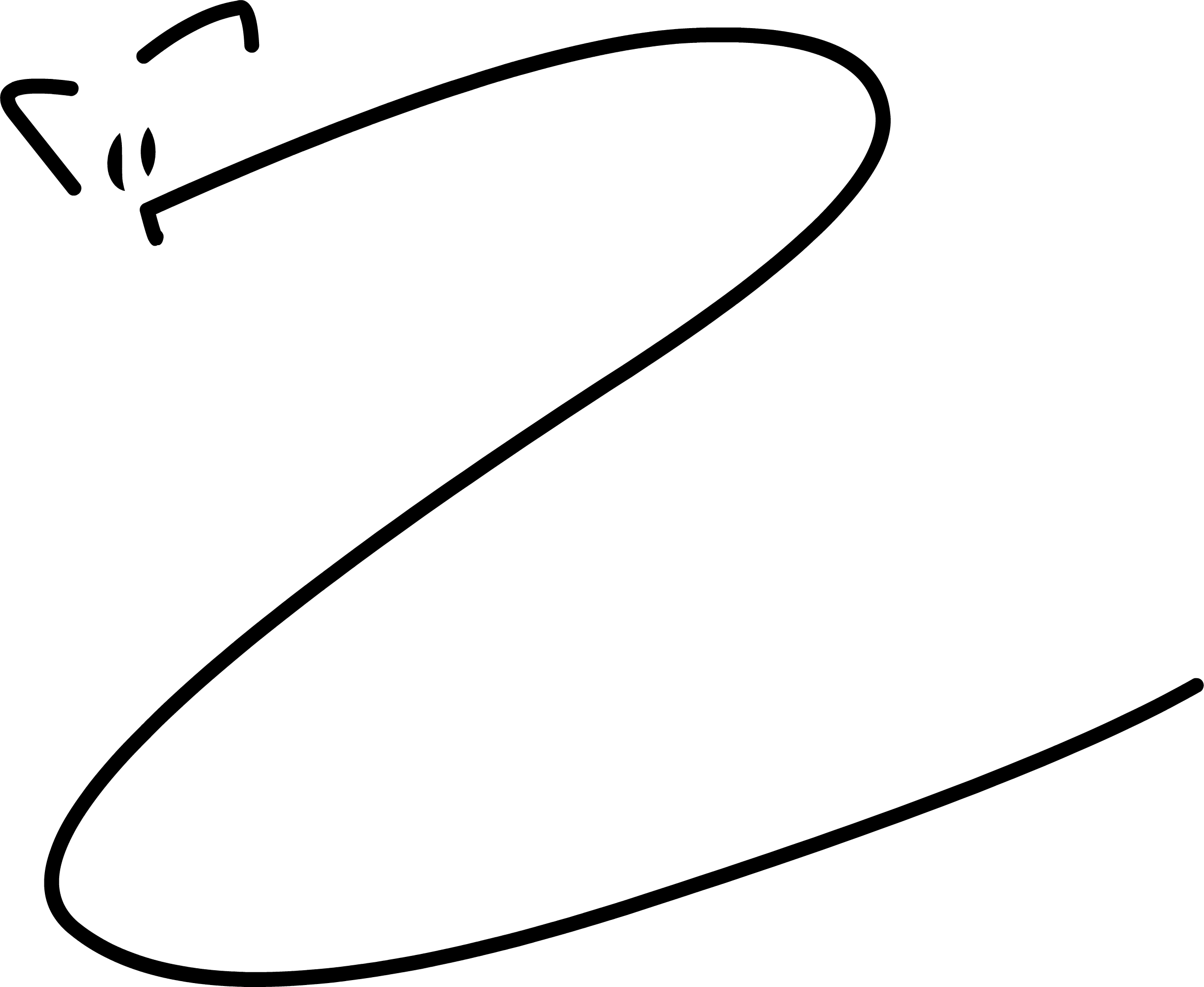

Yang Jeong-in (Korean: 양정인; born February 8, 2001), known professionally as I.N (아이엔), is a South Korean singer. He is a member of the South Korean boy band Stray Kids formed by JYP Entertainment in 2017.

I.N made his acting debut in the final episode of the web series A-Teen 2 in 2019.

== Early life and education ==
Yang Jeong-in was born on February 8, 2001, in Busan, South Korea. He graduated from School of Performing Arts Seoul in February 2021. When he was young, he developed a passion for singing when he was performing trot songs at church.

== Career ==
=== 2017-present: Stray Kids and solo music ===
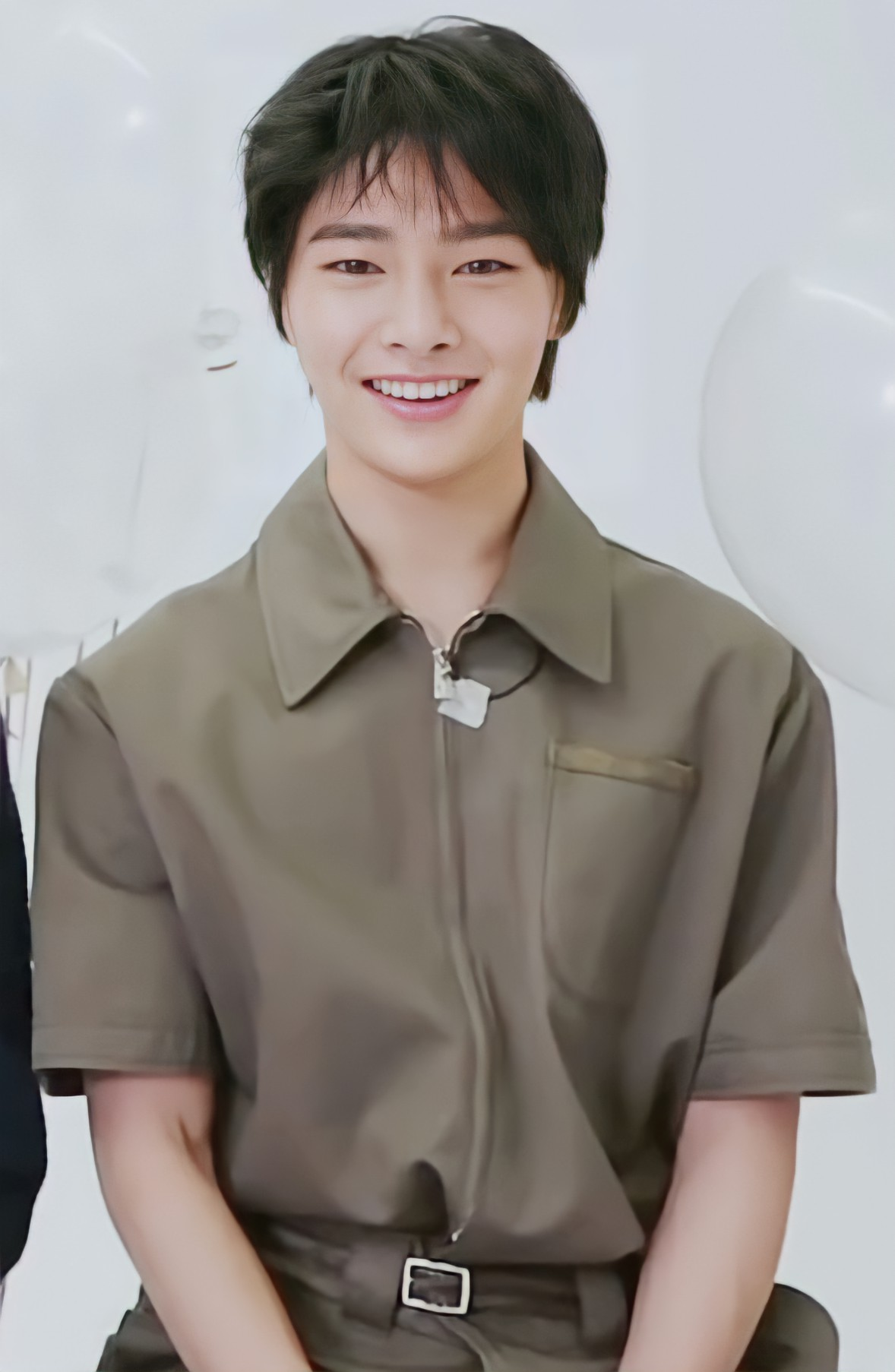
I.N in January 2020

I.N trained at JYP Entertainment and participated in the Stray Kids survival program in late 2017. He debuted with Stray Kids with the EP I Am Not on March 25, 2018, through a debut showcase at Jangchung Arena.

In 2019, I.N made his acting debut with a cameo appearance in the final episode of the web series A-Teen 2, alongside fellow Stray Kids member Hyunjin. On September 21, 2019, he appeared as a special MC on Show! Music Core. Additionally, he appeared as a contestant on episode 3 of the MBC entertainment program Favorite Entertainment, which aired on July 18, 2020, where he gave a trot music performance. In September 2020, I.N collaborated with the bandmates Seungmin and Changbin to release the song "My Universe", which peaked at number 21 on the Billboard World Digital Song Sales chart for the week of 20-26 September.

On 15 January 2021, I.N released his debut solo song, "Maknae on Top", through the SKZ-Player series, featuring bandmates Bang Chan and Changbin. In 2022, he released his solo track "Hug Me", a song he co-wrote, as part of Stray Kids' SKZ-Record series. In October, he again collaborated with Seungmin to release the song "Can't Stop", which was featured on the group's seventh EP, Maxident. The song ranked sixth on Billboard's review of the EP and peaked at number 31 on the Circle Download Chart for the week of October 2–8, 2022. Additionally, during Stray Kids' Maniac World Tour, he collaborated with fellow member Lee Know to perform a cover of Harry Styles' song "Falling".

Billboard ranked I.N ninth in their 2024 K-Pop Artist 100 chart.

On April 8, 2025, it was reported that I.N, along with his bandmates Lee Know and Seungmin, will be part of the original soundtrack for tvN's weekend drama Resident Playbook. The song, dubbed "Start!", was released on April 12, 2025. In November 2026, I.N performed "Guilty Pleasure", his first solo OST song, for tvN's television series Love in Disguise, and released the single "No Return" as part of SKZ-Replay project.

== Influences ==
I.N draws inspiration from artists like Charlie Puth and Bruno Mars, with the latter being his role model.

== Other ventures ==
=== Fashion ===
I.N attended two Alexander McQueen shows during Paris Fashion Week, first appearing at the brand's spring 2024 show in October 2023. In May 2024, I.N made his Met Gala debut with Stray Kids as the guest of Tommy Hilfiger. In the same month, I.N appeared on the cover of W Korea's Vol. 6, wearing Alexander McQueen's first collection. In September, he made his debut at Milan Fashion Week by attending the Bottega Veneta spring 2025 show, where he sat front row alongside A$AP Rocky and Kendall Jenner. In addition, I.N. was featured in Bottega Veneta for various editorials, including a cover story for Rolling Stone UK.

On January 23, 2025, Bottega Veneta announced I.N as its new brand ambassador. I.N became global ambassador for luxury jewelry brand Damiani since May 8, 2025. He appeared on the digital cover of Vanity Fair Italia, the first ever male K-pop act.

=== Philanthropy ===
I.N donated ₩100 million (equivalent to ₩100 million or US$77,960 in 2025) for the healthy growth of underprivileged children in Korea, as reported on June 7, 2024. He became the youngest member of the 'Green Noble Club' by Green Umbrella. In October, he took part in W Korea's "Love Your W" charity event to support breast cancer awareness, promoting a positive influence and helping to raise awareness about the cause.

I.N donated another ₩100 million to Samsung Medical Center to repay the love he received from fans on his birthday, February 8, 2025 as reported on February 10. The donation he made will be used to cover the treatment costs for children with cancer from underprivileged families who are being treated at Samsung Medical Center.

On February 8, 2026, I.N donated ₩100 million to National Cancer Center in Goyang to celebrate his birthday.

== Discography ==
=== Songs ===
List of songs, with selected chart positions, showing year released and album title
Title	Year	Peak chart positions				Album
Title	Year	KOR DL	NZ Hot	UK Sales	US World	Album
"You" (with Changbin and Hyunjin)	2018	—	—	—	—	I Am You
"My Universe" (with Seungmin featuring Changbin)	2020	—	—	—	21	In Life
"Gone Away" (with Han and Seungmin)	2021	25	—	—	—	Noeasy
"Waiting for Us" (피어난다) (with Bang Chan, Lee Know and Seungmin)	2022	25	—	—	—	Oddinary
"Can't Stop" (나 너 좋아하나봐) (with Seungmin)	2022	31	—	—	—	Maxident
"Hug Me" (안아줄게요)	2022	—	—	—	—	SKZ-Replay
"Maknae on Top" (막내온탑) (featuring Bang Chan and Changbin)	2022	—	—	—	—	SKZ-Replay
"Untitled" (미제) (featuring Hyunjin)	2024	—	—	—	—	Non-album single
"Hallucination"	2024	30	—	—	6	Hop
"Burnin' Tires"	2025	160	36	41	3	Mixtape: Dominate
"The Little Things" (행복 뭐 별거 없네요)	2026	—	—	—	—	SKZ-Replay 2026 Pt.1
"No Return"	2026	—	—	—	—	Non-album single
"—" denotes a recording that did not chart or was not released in that region.

=== Soundtrack appearances ===
Title	Year	Peak chart positions		Album
Title	Year	KOR	US World	Album
"Start!" (with Lee Know and Seungmin)	2025	— (Note: "Start!" did not chart on the Circle Digital Chart but peaked at number 58 on the Download Chart, and number 87 on the BGM Chart.)	—	Resident Playbook OST Part.1
"Genie" (with Han and Felix)	2025	— (Note: "Genie" did not chart on the Circle Digital Chart but peaked at number 147 on the Download Chart.)	4	Genie, Make a Wish OST
"Guilty Pleasure"	2026	—	—	Love in Disguise OST
"—" denotes a recording that did not chart or was not released in that region.

== Videography ==
=== Music videos ===
List of music videos, showing year released, artist and name of the album
Title	Year	Artist(s)	Album	Ref.
"Hallucination"	2024	I.N	Hop	
"Start!"	2025	Lee Know, Seungmin, I.N	Resident Playbook OST Part.1	

== Filmography ==
=== Television shows ===
List of TV shows, showing year aired and notes
Year	Title	Roles	Notes	Ref.
2017	Stray Kids	Contestant	Debuted with Stray Kids	
2020	Favourite Entertainment	Contestant	Eliminated in Audition	
2024	King of Mask Singer	Contestant as Catnip	Eliminated in Round 2	

=== Web shows ===
Year	Title	Role	Notes	Ref.
2019	A-Teen 2	Cha Ah-hyun's friend	Cameo (Ep. 16)	

=== Hosting ===
Year	Title	Role	Notes	Ref.
2019	Show! Music Core	Special MC		
