= I'm Yours =

I'm Yours may refer to:

- I'm Yours (film), a 2011 Canadian film
- I'm Yours (Linda Clifford album), 1980
- I'm Yours (Linda Davis album), 1998
  - "I'm Yours" (Linda Davis song), 1998
- I'm Yours (Sizzla album), 2017
- "I'm Yours" (1952 song), a song written by Robert Mellin, also covered by Eddie Fisher and others
- "I'm Yours (Use Me Anyway You Wanna)", a 1971 song made popular by Ike and Tina Turner
- "I'm Yours" (Elvis Presley song), 1961
  - I'm Yours (Dickie Rock song), cover of the Elvis song, 1964
- "I'm Yours" (Jason Mraz song), 2008
- "I'm Yours" (Ringo Starr song), 1998
- "I'm Yours", by Alessia Cara from Know-It-All (album)
- "I'm Yours", by Billie Holiday from The Complete Commodore & Decca Masters
- "I'm Yours", by Brandy Norwood from Brandy
- "I'm Yours", a 2022 song by Isabel LaRosa
- "I'm Yours", by The Script from The Script

== See also ==
- Cuerpo y Alma / I'm Yours, a 2000 album by Soraya
- I'm Yours, You're Mine, a 1997 album by Betty Carter
- I Am Yours (disambiguation)
