= You Am I (disambiguation) =

You Am I are an Australian rock band, formed in 1989.

You Am I may also refer to:

- You Am I (album), their eponymous 2010 studio album
- You Am I (film), a 2006 Lithuanian romance film

== See also ==
- I Am You (disambiguation)
- You and I (disambiguation)
