= I Am Yours =

I Am Yours may refer to:

== Songs ==
- "I Am Yours" (song), by The Makemakes, 2015
- "I Am Yours", by the Adicts from Fifth Overture
- "I Am Yours", by the Afters from Light Up the Sky
- "I Am Yours", by Andy Grammer from Naive
- "I Am Yours", by Bethany Dillon from Stop & Listen
- "I Am Yours", by Catphish from Guaranteed
- "I Am Yours", by Darrell Evans from You Are I AM
- "I Am Yours", by Derek and the Dominos from Layla and Other Assorted Love Songs
- "I Am Yours", by Jeff Deyo from Light
- "I Am Yours", by Lauren Daigle from How Can It Be
- "I Am Yours", by the Main Ingredient from Afrodisiac
- "I Am Yours", by Matt Redman from Intimacy
- "I Am Yours", by Melanie Laine from Time Flies
- "I Am Yours", by Michael Gungor from Bigger Than My Imagination
- "I Am Yours", by Scarlet White from The Inbetween
- "I Am Yours", by Tracy Chapman from Let It Rain

== Other uses ==
- I Am... Yours, the first residency show by American singer Beyoncé
- I Am... Yours: An Intimate Performance at Wynn Las Vegas, a 2009 album by Beyoncé
- I Am Yours (film), a 2013 Norwegian drama film written and directed by Iram Haq

== See also ==
- I'm Yours (disambiguation)
- I Am You (disambiguation)
- Hum Tumhare Hain Sanam, or I Am Yours, Darling, a 2002 Indian film by K. S. Adhiyaman
