= The Sound (Stray Kids album) =

- Regular and digital cover

Studio album by Stray Kids
- Released: February 22, 2023
- Studios: JYPE (Seoul); Channie's "Room" (Seoul)
- Genre: J-pop
- Length: 32:38
- Languages: Japanese; English
- Label: Epic Japan
- Producers: 3Racha; Zack Djurich; Kyle Reynolds; Frants; Versachoi; Nickko Young; Raphael; Daviid; Yosia; HotSauce; Jun2

Stray Kids chronology
SKZ-Replay (2022)	The Sound (2023)	5-Star (2023)

Singles from The Sound
- 1. "Scars" / "Thunderous (Japanese ver.)" Released: October 13, 2021; 2. "Case 143 (Japanese ver.)" Released: December 15, 2022; 3. "The Sound" Released: January 28, 2023

The Sound is the debut Japanese-language studio album and third overall by South Korean boy band Stray Kids. It was released on February 22, 2023, through Epic Records Japan, eight months after their second Japanese-language EP Circus (2022). Centered on an orchestra theme and the group's own unique music concept, the album consists of ten tracks, preceded by "Scars", the Japanese versions of "Thunderous" and "Case 143", and the title track. The Sound debuted atop Oricon Albums Chart for the first time, and Billboard Japan Hot Albums.

== Background and release ==
After the release of the Japanese version of "Case 143" on December 15, 2022, Stray Kids first announced their debut Japanese studio album via a trailer on December 23, 2022, scheduled for release on February 22 next year. The album made available to pre-order on the same day, coming in four editions–limited A (CD + Blu-ray), limited B (CD + SpecialZine), regular, and eight individual-cover FC limited editions. The album's title, The Sound, alongside the track listing, main promotional images, and each edition's cover artworks, were revealed on January 16, 2023. The visuals depict the concept of an orchestra, showing the members playing different musical instruments. The main trailer was uploaded later on January 25. The original track "The Sound" was released on January 28, while "There" later as a promotional single on February 15.

== Music and lyrics ==
The Sound consists of ten tracks; six tracks are original Japanese songs, and four tracks are previous releases recorded in Japanese: "Case 143" and "Chill" from the EP Maxident (2022), and the double A-side single "Scars" and the Japanese version of "Thunderous". The FC limited edition additionally includes the instrumental version of the title track. 3Racha—an in-house production team of Stray Kids members Bang Chan, Changbin, and Han—wrote and produced most songs on the album. In addition, the members Hyunjin and Seungmin also participated in writing "DLMLU", and "Novel", respectively.

The album opens with the title track "The Sound", depicting the group's confidence and attitude toward their music. "Battle Ground" shows "their enthusiasm and determination to survive in the world of music." "Lost Me" is a "heartrending" ballad about loneliness without a loved one. "DLMLU" stands for "Don't Let Me Love You", expressing the feeling of "breaking up". "Novel" shows the imagination of "sweet love in novel or drama" and "the feeling of falling in love". The final track "There" is a "heartrending" and "sad" ballad about the end of love. Described by members, it is the second part of the song "Your Eyes" from their previous EP Circus (2022).

== Promotion ==
To commemorate the release, Stray Kids partnered with Shibuya 109 for Valentine's Day and White Day campaigns, decorating the department store and launching a pop-up store in Tokyo and Osaka in February and March 2023. The group also partnered with Spotify Japan for a stamp rally to attend a special pop-up exhibition at Magnet by Shibuya109 in a week of the release date, and FamilyMart for limited goods. Stray Kids appeared on the covers and gave interviews for magazines Nylon Japan, and Aera. On the release date, the group held a pre-record live event to introduce the album. On March 5, Stray Kids appeared on the Nippon TV's variety show Gyōretsu no Dekiru Sōdansho for breaking foam walls to surprise Japanese actor Rihito Itagaki.

Stray Kids performed "The Sound" for the first time at Music Station on January 27, 2023, as well as at Buzz Rhythm 02 on February 17, The group appeared on the YouTube channel The First Take to perform the re-arranged Japanese version of "Case 143", and "Lost Me" on February 24, and March 8, respectively. The group held the encore shows for Maniac World Tour in Japan on February 11–12 at Saitama Super Arena and 25–26 at Kyocera Dome Osaka. They performed the title track and the Japanese version of "Case 143" from the album at shows.

== Commercial performance ==
According to Oricon, The Sound sold 250,422 copies on February 21, 2023, a flying get date. and 378,000 copies on its first week, debuting at number one on the weekly Albums Chart dated March 6, 2023, surpassing 132,000 copies of the previous release Circus and becoming their first number-one album and highest overall physical sales in Japan. The album also debuted atop the Combined Albums Chart and monthly Albums Chart.

Billboard Japan initially reported that The Sound sold 354,746 physical copies and 1,006 downloads during February 20–22. The album debut at number one on the Billboard Japan Hot Albums, earning 450,808 physical copies, debuting atop the Top Albums Sales; and 1,434 digital sales, landing at number two on the Download Albums. For the 2023 Billboard Japan year-end charts, the album reached number six on the Hot Albums, earning 624,173 CDs and 2,754 digital sales. The Sound was certified gold by Recording Industry Association of Japan (RIAJ) on March 10. and later double platinum next month.

== Track listing ==
The Sound track listing
No.	Title	Lyrics	Music	Arrangement	Length
1.	"The Sound"	Bang Chan (3Racha); Changbin (3Racha); Han (3Racha); D&H (Purple Night)	Bang Chan; Changbin; Han; Zack Djurich; Kyle Reynolds	Djurich; Reynolds; Bang Chan	3:00
2.	"Battle Ground"	Bang Chan; Changbin; Han; KM-Markit	Bang Chan; Changbin; Han; Frants	Bang Chan; Frants	3:33
3.	"Lost Me"	Changbin; Sunny Boy	Changbin; Bang Chan; Versachoi	Bang Chan; Versachoi	3:09
4.	"DLMLU"	Hyunjin; Yohei	Hyunjin; Bang Chan; Versachoi	Bang Chan; Versachoi	3:14
5.	"Novel"	Seungmin; KM-Markit	Seungmin; Bang Chan; Nickko Young	Bang Chan; Nickko Young	3:08
6.	"Case 143" (Japanese version)	Bang Chan; Changbin; Han; KM-Markit	Bang Chan; Changbin; Han; Raphael (Producing Lab); Daviid (3scape); Yosia (3scape)	Raphael; Daviid; Yosia; Bang Chan	3:13
7.	"Chill" (Japanese version)	Han; KM-Markit	Han; Bang Chan	Versachoi; Bang Chan	3:18
8.	"Scars"	Bang Chan; Changbin; Han; KM-Markit	Armadillo; Bang Chan; Changbin; Han	Bang Chan; Versachoi	3:19
9.	"Thunderous" (Japanese version)	Bang Chan; Changbin; Han; KM-Markit	Bang Chan; Changbin; Han; HotSauce	HotSauce; Bang Chan	3:04
10.	"There"	Changbin; Bang Chan; KM-Markit	Changbin; Bang Chan; Jun2	Jun2; Bang Chan	3:35
Total length:					32:38

The Sound FC limited bonus track
No.	Title	Music	Arrangement	Length
11.	"The Sound" (instrumental)	Bang Chan; Changbin; Han; Djurich; Reynolds	Djurich; Reynolds; Bang Chan	3:00
Total length:				35:38

The Sound Limited A bonus tracks (Blu-ray)
No.	Title	Director(s)	Length
1.	"Jacket Shooting Making Movie"
2.	"The Sound Recording Making Movie"
3.	"SKZ Museum"
4.	"Circus" (music video)	Bang Jae-yeob	3:20
5.	"Circus" (music video making movie)
6.	"Your Eyes" (music video)	Novvkim	3:33
7.	"Your Eyes" (music video making movie)
Total length:			128:38

Notes

- "DLMLU" is an acronym for "Don't Let Me Love You".

== Credits and personnel ==
Musicians

- Stray Kids – vocals (all), background vocals (1, 3–5, 10)
  - Bang Chan (3Racha) – background vocals (8), all instruments (1–5, 10), computer programming (1, 3–5, 8, 10), vocal directing (1, 3–5, 10), synthesizer (7), piano (7)
  - Changbin (3Racha) – background vocals (8), vocal directing (1, 3, 10)
  - Hyunjin – vocal directing (4)
  - Han (3Racha) – background vocals (8), vocal directing (1)
  - Felix – background vocals (8)
  - Seungmin – background vocals (8), vocal directing (5)
- Zach Djurich – all instruments (1), computer programming (1)
- Frants – computer programming (2), all instruments (2)
- Versachoi – all instruments (3–4), computer programming (3–4, 8), vocal directing (3), synthesizer (7), piano (7), bass (7), drum (7)
- Nickko Young – all instruments (5), computer programming (5)
- Raphael (Producing Lab) – drum (6), bass guitar (6), synthesizer (6), electric guitar (6), computer programming (6)
- Daviid (3scape) – drum (6), bass (6), synthesizer (6), computer programming (6)
- Yosia (3scape) – piano (6), electric piano (6)
- HotSauce – keyboard (9), drum programming (9), computer programming (9)
- Jun2 – all instruments (10), computer programming (10), vocal directing (10)

Technical

- Lee Kyeong-won – digital editing (1–6, 9–10)
- Bang Chan (3Racha) – digital editing (1, 6–8), recording (6–7)
- HotSauce – digital editing (9)
- Goo Hye-jin – recording (1, 5, 7, 10)
- Lee Sang-yeop – recording (2, 6, 9)
- Lim Chan-mi – recording (3–4, 6)
- Eom Se-hee – recording (6, 9)
- Choi Hye-jin – recording (8)
- Curtis Douglas – mixing (1)
- Lee Tae-sub – mixing (2, 6, 8)
- Yoon Won-kwon – mixing (3–5, 7, 10)
- Tony Maserati – mixing (9)
- David K. Younghyun – mix engineering (9)
- Dave Kutch – mastering (1, 6)
- Park Jeong-eon – mastering (2)
- Kwon Nam-woo – mastering (3–5, 7–10)

Locations

- Sony Music Publishing (Japan) Inc. – publishing (all)
- JYP Publishing (KOMCA) – publishing (all)
- Copyright Control – publishing (1, 5–6)
- Hybe Co., Ltd. publishing (2)
- JYPE Studios – recording (all), mixing (2, 6, 8)
- Channie's "Room" – recording (6)
- Studio DDeepKick – mixing (3–5, 7, 10)
- Chapel Swing Studios – mixing (9)
- The Mastering Palace – mastering (1, 6)
- Honey Butter Studio – mastering (2)
- 821 Sound Mastering – mastering (3–5, 7–10)

== Charts ==
=== Weekly charts ===
Weekly chart performance for The Sound
Chart (2023)	Peak position
Hungarian Albums (MAHASZ)	13
Japanese Albums (Oricon)	1
Japanese Combined Albums (Oricon)	1
Japanese Hot Albums (Billboard Japan)	1
UK Album Downloads (Official Charts)	87

=== Monthly charts ===
Monthly chart performance for The Sound
Chart (2023)	Position
Japanese Albums (Oricon)	1

=== Year-end charts ===
Year-end chart performance for The Sound
Chart (2023)	Position
Japanese Albums (Oricon)	9
Japanese Combined Albums (Oricon)	8
Japanese Hot Albums (Billboard Japan)	6

== Certifications and sales ==
Certifications and sales figures for The Sound
Region	Certification	Certified units/sales
Japan (RIAJ) Physical	2× Platinum	500,000^{^}
Japan Digital	—	2,252
^{^} Shipments figures based on certification alone.

== Release history ==
Release dates and formats for The Sound
Region	Date	Format	Version	Label	Ref.
Japan	February 22, 2023	CD + Blu-ray	Limited A	Epic Japan	
Japan	February 22, 2023	CD + SpecialZine	Limited B	Epic Japan	
Japan	February 22, 2023	CD	Regular	Epic Japan	
Japan	February 22, 2023	CD	FC limited	Epic Japan	
Various	February 22, 2023	Digital download; streaming	Regular	Epic Japan	
South Korea	February 22, 2023	Digital download; streaming	Regular	JYP	

== See also ==
- List of Oricon number-one albums of 2023
- List of Billboard Japan Hot Albums number ones of 2023
