= Step Out of Clé =

Single album by Stray Kids
- Released: January 24, 2020
- Studio: JYPE (Seoul)
- Length: 6:24
- Language: English
- Label: JYP
- Producer: 3Racha; DallasK; Hong Ji-sang

Stray Kids chronology
Clé: Levanter (2019)	Step Out of Clé (2020)	SKZ2020 (2020)

Performance video
- "Double Knot" (English version) on YouTube

Step Out of Clé is a single album by South Korean boy band Stray Kids. It was released digitally on January 24, 2020, through JYP Entertainment. It consists of English versions of the Clé: Levanter songs "Double Knot" and "Levanter" in support of the United States leg of their first concert tour District 9: Unlock World Tour.

== Release and promotion ==
On January 10, 2020, Stray Kids posted a photo on their social media, depicting the members standing back and the background of a traditional Korean palace with the text "2020. 1. 24 Coming soon". Four days later, they announced the single Step Out of Clé, which would be released on January 24, alongside its cover artwork. It contains two tracks of the singles "Double Knot", and "Levanter" from the group's fifth extended play Clé: Levanter sung in English. The group uploaded the group promotional image on January 17, depicting the members in student uniform but untieing the tie, and making up with the scratch. The teaser video for "Double Knot (English ver.)" was uploaded on January 21, and its performance video on the same day as Step Out of Clé release at 14:00 KST or 0:00 ET.

To promote Step Out of Clé and their first world tour District 9: Unlock, Stray Kids appeared in the U.S. morning shows Live with Kelly and Ryan on January 27, 2020, and Good Day New York the next day, to perform the English version of "Levanter", and "Double Knot", respectively.

== Commercial performance ==
Upon Step Out of Clé release, "Double Knot" and "Levanter" re-entered the Billboard World Digital Song Sales, dated at February 8, 2020, at number six and five, respectively.

== Track listing ==
Step Out of Clé track listing
No.	Title	Lyrics	Music	Arrangement	Length
1.	"Double Knot" (English version)	Bang Chan (3Racha)^{[a]}; Changbin (3Racha); Han (3Racha)	Bang Chan; Changbin; Han; Nick Furlong; DallasK	DallasK; Bang Chan	3:09
2.	"Levanter" (English version)	Bang Chan; Changbin; Han; J.Y. Park "The Asiansoul"; Herz Analog; Sophia Pae^{[a]}	Bang Chan; Changbin; Han; Hong Ji-sang	Hong Ji-sang	3:15
Total length:					6:24

Notes

- ^{^[a]} signifies an English lyricist.

== Credits and personnel ==
Musicians

- Stray Kids – vocals
  - Bang Chan (3Racha) – background vocals (all), lyrics (all), English lyrics (1), composition (all), arrangement (1)
  - Changbin (3Racha) – background vocals (all), lyrics (all), composition (all)
  - Han (3Racha) – background vocals (all), lyrics (all), composition (all)
  - Hyunjin – background vocals (1)
  - Seungmin – background vocals (2)
- J.Y. Park "The Asiansoul" – lyrics (2)
- Herz Analog – lyrics (2)
- Sophia Pae – English lyrics (2)
- Nick Furlong – composition (1), all instruments (1)
- DallasK – composition (1), arrangement (1), all instruments (1)
- Hong Ji-sang – composition (2), arrangement (2), all instruments (2), keyboard (2), electric guitar (2)

Technical

- Choi Hye-jin – recording (all)
- Nick Furlong – instrument recording (1)
- DallasK – instrument recording (1)
- Distract – vocal direction (1)
- Jang Han-soo – vocal editing (1)
- Lee Tae-sub – mixing (1)
- Ken Lewis – mixing (2)
- Park Jeong-eon – mastering (1)
- Chris Gehringer – mastering (2)
  - Will Quinnell – assistant (2)

Locations

- JYP Studios – recording, mixing (1)
- Westlake Studios – instrument recording (1)
- Honey Butter Studio – mastering (1)
- Sterling Sound – mastering (2)

== Release history ==
Release history for Step Out of Clé
Region	Date	Format	Label	Ref.
Various	January 24, 2020	Digital download; streaming	JYP	
