= Scars (Stray Kids song) =

2021 single by Stray Kids

- Regular and digital cover

Single by Stray Kids

from the album The Sound
- Language: Japanese; English
- A-side: "Thunderous (Japanese ver.)"
- B-side: "Call"
- Released: October 13, 2021
- Studio: JYPE (Seoul)
- Genre: J-pop
- Length: 3:20
- Label: Epic Japan; JYP
- Composers: Armadillo; Bang Chan; Changbin; Han
- Lyricists: Bang Chan; Changbin; Han; KM-Markit (Japanese)

Stray Kids singles chronology
| "Thunderous" (2021) | "Scars" (2021) | "Christmas EveL" / "Winter Falls" (2021) |

Music video
- "Scars" on YouTube

"Scars" is a song recorded by South Korean boy band Stray Kids. It was released on October 13, 2021, as a double A-side Japanese second single together with the Japanese version of "Thunderous", through Epic Records Japan. Written by 3Racha, KM-Markit, and Armadillo, it shows the group's determination to continue to make deep and large scars to grasp a bigger dream even though they have a lot of them. The song peaked at number two on both Oricon Singles Chart, and Billboard Japan Hot 100, selling over 180,000 copies in the first week in Japan. The Korean version of "Scars" was released on December 23 as a lead single of their second compilation album SKZ2021.

== Background and release ==
On July 30, 2021, Stray Kids announced the release of their second Japanese single on October 13, with five physical editions: three first press limited (A, B, C), regular, and FC. The group counted down to announce the single's title and details from September 3 to 8 with individual concept photos. They announce the title on September 9, called "Scars" and the Japanese version of "Thunderous", as a double A-side single, with the B-side "Call", and the Japanese version of "My Pace" as a bonus track from the first press limited editions. "Scars" was pre-released to digital music and streaming platform on October 6. Stray Kids released the Korean version of "Scars" as a lead single of the compilation album SKZ2021 on December 21.

== Composition and lyrics ==
"Scars" is described as an "energetic" and "touching" medium number (a ballad with a bit of more tempo) song, composed in the key of C major, 80 beats per minute with a running time of 3 minutes and 21 seconds. 3Racha (Bang Chan, Changbin, Han) written and co-composed the song with Armadillo. The Japanese lyrics were written by KM-Markit. Bang Chan and Versachoi are in charge of arrangement. Lyrically, the song expresses Stray Kids' determination to continue making deep and large scars to grasp a bigger dream even though they already have a lot of them. It compares scars to the group's effort, tears and sweat. The B-side "Call" is a pop song about a still lingering feeling of love.

== Commercial performance ==
In Japan's Oricon charts, "Scars" landed at number 32 on the Combined Singles Chart dated October 18. before combined with "Thunderous" (Japanese ver.) and peaked at number two in next week. The double A-side single with the Japanese version of "Thunderous" debuted at number 2 on the Oricon Singles Chart dated October 25, selling 119,963 copies in the first week, surpassing 37,157 copies of "Top" (Japanese ver.). For Billboard Japan Hot 100, "Scars" entered at number 39 for the dated issue of October 13, before peaked at number 2 of October 20 due to the CD single release, behide only Sakurazaka46's "Nagaredama". The single was sold 182,405 CD copies (number two on the Top Singles Sales) in the first week, surpassing 49,329 copies of their first Japanese single, 1,402 download units (number 46 on the Download Songs), and earned 3,980,778 Japan streams (number 46 on the Streaming Songs) on the week.

For international charts, "Scars" landed at number 7 on the Billboard World Digital Song Sales in the week ending October 16, 2021, making Stray Kids' fifteenth top ten song on the chart, and entered 40th week of Hungary's Single Top 40 at number 11.

== Music video ==
An accompanying music video of "Scars" was premiered on October 6, 2021. It depicts the group journeying into a mysterious land and following a sparkle of fireflies that lead the group towards a giant box of light. The music video also features scenes of the group's sleek and powerful choreography.

== Live performance ==
Stray Kids made a debut performance of "Scars" on October 12 at NHK E's Numa ni Hamatte Kiite Mita as well as Nippon TV's Music Blood, alongside 2PM's "Again & Again"'s cover on October 15, and Fuji TV's Love Music on October 24. The group performed "Scars" at the Japanese YouTube channel program The First Take on November 10, after performed "Mixtape: Oh" on October 29. The Korean version was performed for the first time at the group's second fan meeting 2nd #LoveStay 'SKZ's Chocolate Factory', which was held on February 12–13 at Olympic Hall.

== Track listing ==
All editions^{[a]} – CD
| No. | Title | Lyrics | Music | Arrangement | Length |
|---|---|---|---|---|---|
| 1. | "Scars" | Bang Chan (3Racha); Changbin (3Racha); Han (3Racha); KM-Markit | Armadillo; Bang Chan (3Racha); Changbin (3Racha); Han (3Racha) | Bang Chan (3Racha); Versachoi | 3:20 |
| 2. | "Thunderous" (ソリクン; Japanese version) | Bang Chan (3Racha); Changbin (3Racha); Han (3Racha); KM-Markit | Bang Chan (3Racha); Changbin (3Racha); Han (3Racha); HotSauce | HotSauce; Bang Chan (3Racha) | 3:05 |
| 3. | "Call" | Han (3Racha); KM-Markit | Bang Chan (3Racha); Han (3Racha) | Bang Chan (3Racha) | 2:47 |
| Total length: | | | | | 9:12 |

First press limited edition bonus track – CD
| No. | Title | Lyrics | Music | Arrangement | Length |
|---|---|---|---|---|---|
| 4. | "My Pace" (Japanese version) | Bang Chan (3Racha); Changbin (3Racha); Han (3Racha); KM-Markit; J.Y. Park 'The Asiansoul'^{[b]} | Bang Chan (3Racha); Changbin (3Racha); Han (3Racha); Earattack; Larmook | Earattack; Larmook; Gongdo | 3:11 |
| Total length: | | | | | 12:23 |

First press limited edition A – Blu-ray
| No. | Title | Length |
|---|---|---|
| 1. | "Jacket shooting making movie" |

First press limited edition B – Blu-ray
| No. | Title | Director(s) | Length |
|---|---|---|---|
| 1. | "Thunderous" (Japanese version; performance music video) | Novvkim | 3:09 |
| 2. | "Thunderous" (Japanese version; performance music video making movie) |

Notes

- ^{^[a]} In the first press limited edition B, "Thunderous" (Japanese version) is listed as the first track, and "Scars" as the second track.
- ^{^[b]} Signifies an additional lyricist
- "Call" is stylized in all caps

== Credits and personnel ==
Credits adapted from CD single liner notes.

Locations

- Published by Sony Music Publishing (Japan) Inc., JYP Publishing (KOMCA)
- Recorded and mixed at JYPE Studios
- Mastered at 821 Sound Mastering

Personnel

- Stray Kids – lead vocals
  - Bang Chan (3Racha) – lyrics, background vocals, composition, arrangement, computer programming, digital editing
  - Changbin (3Racha) – lyrics, background vocals, composition
  - Han (3Racha) – lyrics, background vocals, composition
  - Felix – background vocals
  - Seungmin – background vocals
- KM-Markit – Japanese lyrics
- Armadillo – composition
- Versachoi – arrangement, computer programming
- Choi Hye-jin – recording
- Lee Tae-sub – mixing
- Kwon Nam-woo – mastering

"Call"

- Stray Kids – lead vocals
  - Han (3Racha) – lyrics, background vocals, composition
  - Bang Chan (3Racha) – lyrics, background vocals, composition, arrangement, computer programming, digital editing
- KM-Markit – Japanese lyrics
- Choi Hye-jin – recording
- Lim Hong-jin – mixing
- Kwon Nam-woo – mastering

== Charts ==
=== Weekly charts ===
Chart performance for "Scars"
| Chart (2021) | Peak position |
|---|---|
| Belgian Albums (Ultratop Wallonia) Scars / Sorikun | 160 |
| Hungary (Single Top 40) | 11 |
| Japan Hot 100 (Billboard) | 2 |
| Japan (Oricon) Scars / Thunderous (Japanese ver.) | 2 |
| Japan Combined Singles (Oricon) Scars / Thunderous (Japanese ver.) | 2 |
| South Korea Download (Gaon) Korean version | 114 |
| US World Digital Song Sales (Billboard) | 7 |

=== Monthly charts ===
Monthly chart performance for "Scars"
| Chart (2021) | Position |
|---|---|
| Japan (Oricon) Scars / Thunderous (Japanese ver.) | 6 |

=== Year-end charts ===
Year-end chart performance for "Scars"
| Chart (2021) | Position |
|---|---|
| Japan Top Singles Sales (Billboard Japan) Scars / Thunderous (Japanese ver.) | 43 |
| Japan (Oricon) Scars / Thunderous (Japanese ver.) | 52 |

== Certifications and sales ==
Sales certifications for "Scars"
| Region | Certification | Certified units/sales |
|---|---|---|
| Japan (RIAJ) Scars / Thunderous (Japanese ver.) physical | Platinum | 136,944 |

== Release history ==
Release dates and formats for "Scars"
| Region | Date | Format | Version | Label | Ref. |
|---|---|---|---|---|---|
| Various | October 6, 2021 | Digital download; streaming | Pre-release | Epic Japan | |
| Various | October 13, 2021 | Digital download; streaming | Original | Epic Japan | |
| South Korea | October 13, 2021 | Digital download; streaming | Original | JYP | |
| Japan | October 13, 2021 | CD+Blu-ray | First press limited A | Epic Japan | |
| Japan | October 13, 2021 | CD+Blu-ray | First press limited B | Epic Japan | |
| Japan | October 13, 2021 | CD+SpecialZine | First press limited C | Epic Japan | |
| Japan | October 13, 2021 | CD | Regular | Epic Japan | |
| Japan | October 13, 2021 | CD | FC | Epic Japan | |
| Various | December 23, 2021 | Digital download; streaming | Korean | JYP | |
