= SKZ-Replay =

Compilation album by Stray Kids
- Released: December 21, 2022
- Studios: Channie's "Room" (Seoul); JYPE (Seoul); Jisang's (Seoul)
- Genres: K-pop; hip hop; rock
- Length: 80:01
- Languages: Korean; English
- Labels: JYP; Republic
- Producers: 3Racha; Versachoi; HotSauce; Millionboy; Nickko Young; Shim Eun-jee; Hong Ji-sang; Semi Kim; Bush; Nick Lee; Josh Wei

Stray Kids chronology
Maxident (2022)	SKZ-Replay (2022)	The Sound (2023)

Singles from SKZ-Replay
- 1. "Fam (Korean ver.)" Released: December 21, 2022

SKZ-Replay is the third compilation album by South Korean boy band Stray Kids. It was released digitally on December 21, 2022, through JYP Entertainment and Republic Records. Consisting of 25 tracks, the album split into two sides: the A-side contains ten songs, eight performed solo and two performed by the group as a whole, and the B-side includes fifteen original songs from their video series SKZ-Player and SKZ-Record.

== Background ==
Stray Kids released the video series SKZ-Player and SKZ-Record to showcase their self-written songs and covers, as well as other non-promotional projects published unofficially on various online video platforms. SKZ-Player was released as music videos, while SKZ-Record was released as audio-only videos. The first video from the SKZ-Player series was Lee Know, Hyunjin, and Felix's choreography video, uploaded on August 26, 2018. The first video of SKZ-Record was Seungmin's cover of "Start Over", originally performed by Gaho for the television series Itaewon Class, published on May 4, 2020. "Fam" was originally recorded in Japanese and included on Stray Kids' debut Japanese-language EP All In, released on November 4, 2020. The music video for the unreleased track "#LoveStay" was uploaded on December 31, 2021, as a tribute to the group's fans, collectively called "Stay".

== Release and promotion ==
On January 1, 2022, JYP Entertainment uploaded the video "Step Out 2022", which outlined Stray Kids' accomplishments in 2021 and goals for the new year, including plans for an album that collected songs from the SKZ-Player and SKZ-Record series. At their "Seoul Special (Unveil 11)" show of Maniac World Tour on September 17, the group debuted the Korean version of "Fam" during the encore. On November 9, Stray Kids revealed the souvenirs for the third-generation official fan club recruitment, including a promotional CD for the album titled SKZ-Replay. They stated that the album would be released digitally in December 2022 and consist of an A and B-side; the CD would contain only songs from the A-side. One month later, on December 14, SKZ-Replay was formally announced for release on December 21. The track listing was revealed over the following two days. It consists of 25 tracks, including eight new tracks performed as solos by each member, besides the previously published tracks. An accompanying music video for the Korean version of "Fam" was also uploaded on the same day as the album's release.

== Track listing ==
SKZ-Replay track listing – A-side
No.	Title	Lyrics	Music	Arrangement	Length
1.	"Fam" (Korean version)	Bang Chan (3Racha); Changbin (3Racha); Han (3Racha)	Bang Chan; Changbin; Han; Versachoi^{[a]}	Bang Chan; Versachoi	3:32
2.	"Connected" (Bang Chan)	Bang Chan	Bang Chan; Versachoi	Bang Chan; Versachoi	2:51
3.	"Limbo" (나지막이; Lee Know)	Lee Know	Lee Know; HotSauce	HotSauce	3:17
4.	"Doodle" (Changbin)	Changbin	Changbin; Millionboy	Millionboy; Bang Chan	3:04
5.	"Love Untold" (Hyunjin)	Hyunjin	Hyunjin; Bang Chan	Bang Chan; Nickko Young	3:30
6.	"Run" (Han)	Han	Han; Bang Chan	Bang Chan	2:58
7.	"Deep End" (Felix)	Felix	Shim Eun-jee; Felix	Shim Eun-jee	3:28
8.	"Stars and Raindrops" (내려요; Seungmin)	Seungmin; Hong Ji-sang	Seungmin; Hong Ji-sang	Hong Ji-sang	3:49
9.	"Hug Me" (안아줄게요; I.N)	I.N	I.N; Bang Chan; Nickko Young	Bang Chan; Nickko Young	3:00
10.	"#LoveStay"	Hyunjin; Felix; I.N	Hyunjin; Semi Kim	Semi Kim; Bang Chan	3:17
Total length:					32:46

SKZ-Replay track listing – B-side
No.	Title	Lyrics	Music	Arrangement	Length
1.	"Zone" (Bang Chan, Changbin, Han)	Bang Chan; Changbin; Han	Bang Chan; Changbin; Han	Bang Chan	3:32
2.	"Close" (Han)	Han	Han; Bang Chan	Bang Chan	3:46
3.	"Streetlight" (Changbin featuring Bang Chan)	Changbin	Changbin; Bang Chan	Bang Chan	3:09
4.	"I Hate to Admit" (인정하기 싫어; Bang Chan)	Bang Chan	Bang Chan	Bang Chan	2:50
5.	"I Got It" (Han)	Han	Han; Bang Chan	Bang Chan	2:50
6.	"Miss You" (꼬마별; Hyunjin)	Hyunjin	Hyunjin; Bush	Bush	3:08
7.	"Maknae on Top" (막내온탑; I.N featuring Bang Chan, Changbin)	I.N; Bang Chan; Changbin	I.N; Bang Chan	Bang Chan	2:33
8.	"Alien" (외계인; Han)	Han	Han; Bang Chan	Bang Chan	3:19
9.	"Because" (좋으니까; Changbin, Felix)	Changbin; Felix	Changbin; Bang Chan	Bang Chan	3:18
10.	"Piece of a Puzzle" (조각; Changbin, Seungmin)	Changbin; Seungmin	Changbin; Seungmin; Bang Chan	Bang Chan	2:53
11.	"Wish You Back" (Han)	Han	Han; Bang Chan	Bang Chan	3:18
12.	"Happy" (Han)	Han	Han; Bang Chan	Bang Chan	3:29
13.	"Up All Night" (오늘 밤 나는 불을 켜; Bang Chan, Changbin, Felix, Seungmin)	Bang Chan; Changbin	Bang Chan; Nick Lee; Josh Wei	Nick Lee; Josh Wei; Bang Chan	3:21
14.	"Drive" (Bang Chan, Lee Know)	Bang Chan; Lee Know	Bang Chan; Taalthechoi^{[a]}	Taalthechoi	2:44
15.	"Ice.Cream" (Hyunjin)	Hyunjin	Hyunjin; Bang Chan	Bang Chan	2:50
Total length:					47:00

Notes

- ^{^[a]} Versachoi and Taalthechoi are different pseudonyms for the same person.

== Credits and personnel ==
Musicians

- Bang Chan (3Racha) – vocals (A-side: 1, 2, 10; B-side: 1, 3, 4, 7, 13, 14), all instruments (A-side: 1, 2, 4–6, 9; B-side: 1–5, 7–12, 14, 15), computer programming (A-side: 2, 4–6, 10; B-side: 1–5, 7–12, 14, 15)
- Lee Know – vocals (A-side: 1, 3, 10; B-side: 14)
- Changbin (3Racha) – vocals (A-side: 1, 4, 10; B-side: 1, 3, 7, 9, 10, 13)
- Hyunjin – vocals (A-side: 1, 5, 10; B-side: 6, 15), background vocals (B-side: 6), vocal directing (B-side: 6)
- Han (3Racha) – vocals (A-side: 1, 6, 10; B-side: 1, 2, 5, 8, 11, 12)
- Felix – vocals (A-side: 1, 7, 10; B-side: 9, 13)
- Seungmin – vocals (A-side: 1, 8, 10; B-side: 10, 13), background vocals (A-side: 8)
- I.N – vocals (A-side: 1, 9, 10; B-side: 7)
- Ekko – chorus (A-side: 3)
- Versachoi / Taalthechoi – all instruments (A-side: 1, 2), computer programming (A-side: 1, 2, 13)
- HotSauce – piano (A-side: 3), computer programming (A-side: 3)
- Kim Wang-joon – bass (A-side: 3)
- Bang In-jae – guitar (A-side: 3)
- Millionboy – all instruments (A-side: 4), computer programming (A-side: 4)
- Nickko Young – all instruments (A-side: 5, 9), computer programming (A-side: 9)
- Shim Eun-jee – piano (A-side: 7), vocal directing (A-side: 7)
- Hong Ji-sang – electric guitar (A-side: 8), bass (A-side: 8), piano (A-side: 8), computer programming (A-side: 8)
- Semi Kim – keyboard (A-side: 10), bass (A-side: 10), string (A-side: 10), computer programming (A-side: 10)
- Bush – bass (B-side: 6), synthesizer (B-side: 6), computer programming (B-side: 6)
- Ra Kyung-oe – guitar (B-side: 6)
- Nok – piano (B-side: 6)
- Nick Lee – all instruments (B-side: 13)
- Josh Wei – all instruments (B-side: 13)

Technical

- Lee Kyeong-won – digital editing (A-side: 1, 5, 9, 10)
- Bang Chan (3Racha) – digital editing (A-side: 2, 4, 6; B-side: 1–5, 7–15), recording (A-side: 1, 2, 4, 6; B-side: 1–5, 7–15), mixing (B-side: 4)
- HotSauce – digital editing (A-side: 3)
- Bush – digital editing (B-side: 6)
- Shim Eun-jee – digital editing (A-side: 7), vocal editing (A-side: 7)
- Nick Lee – digital editing (B-side: 13)
- Josh Wei – digital editing (B-side: 13)
- Lee Sang-yeop – recording (A-side: 1, 9), mixing (A-side: 9)
- Lim Chan-mi – recording (A-side: 3)
- Park Eun-jung – recording (A-side: 5)
- Seo Eun-il – recording (A-side: 5)
- Goo Hye-jin – recording (A-side: 7, 10)
- Hong Ji-sang – recording (A-side: 8)
- Hyunjin – recording (B-side: 6)
- Shin Bong-won – mixing (A-side: 1, 3)
- Yoon Won-kwon – mixing (A-side: 2, 5, 7; B-side: 1, 7, 14)
- Stay Tuned – mixing (A-side: 4; B-side: 5, 8, 12)
- Lim Hong-jin – mixing (A-side: 6, 10; B-side: 6, 9, 10)
- Lee Tae-sub – mixing (A-side: 8; B-side: 15)
- Master Key – mixing (B-side: 2, 3, 11)
- Sam Sherbin – mixing (B-side: 13)
- Park Nam-joon – engineering (A-side: 1, 3)
- Park Jung-eon – mastering (A-side: 1)
- Kwon Nam-woo – mastering (A-side: 2–10; B-side: all)

Locations

- JYP Publishing (KOMCA) – publishing (all), sub-publishing (B-side: 13)
- Copyright Control – publishing (A-side: 9, 10)
- Atlas Music Group (ASCAP) – publishing (B-side: 13)
- Sumowhaleboy (ASCAP) – publishing (B-side: 13)
- Snakeweed Studios LLP – publishing (B-side: 13)
- Peermusic (UK) – sub-publishing (B-side: 13)
- Universal Music Publishing Korea – sub-publishing (B-side: 13)
- Channie's "Room" – recording (A-side: 1, 2, 4, 6; B-side: 1–5, 7–15), mixing (B-side: 4)
- JYPE Studios – recording (A-side: 1, 3, 5, 7, 9, 10; B-side: 6, 9, 10), mixing (A-side: 6, 8–10; B-side: 6, 9, 10, 15)
- Jisang's Studio – recording (A-side: 8)
- GLAB Studios – mixing (A-side: 1, 3), engineering (A-side: 1, 3)
- Studio DDeepKick – mixing (A-side: 2, 5, 7; B-side: 1, 7, 14)
- Stay Tuned Studio – mixing (A-side: 4; B-side: 5, 8, 12)
- 821 Sound – mixing (B-side: 2, 3, 11), mastering (A-side: 2–10; B-side: all)
- SonicsScents Studio – mixing (B-side: 13)
- Honey Butter Studio – mastering (A-side: 1)

== Charts ==
=== Weekly charts ===
Weekly chart performance for SKZ-Replay
Chart (2022–2023)	Peak position
Japanese Combined Albums (Oricon)	23
Japanese Hot Albums (Billboard Japan)	18
UK Album Downloads (Official Charts)	28
US World Albums (Billboard)	11

=== Year-end charts ===
Year-end chart performance for SKZ-Replay
Chart (2023)	Position
Japanese Download Albums (Billboard Japan)	75

== Release history ==
Release dates and formats for SKZ-Replay
Region	Date	Format	Label	Ref.
Various	December 21, 2022	Digital download; streaming	JYP; Republic	
