= Clé 2: Yellow Wood =

EP by Stray Kids
- Released: June 19, 2019
- Recorded: 2018–19
- Studios: The Vibe Studio; Prelude Studio; JYPE Studios
- Genres: Hip-hop; EDM; K-pop
- Length: 25:31
- Languages: Korean; English
- Labels: JYP; Dreamus
- Producers: 3Racha; 1Take; Crash Cove; collapsedone; Doplamingo; Grvvity; Tak; Time; Matthew Tishler; Versachoi

Stray Kids chronology
Clé 1: Miroh (2019)	Clé 2: Yellow Wood (2019)	Clé: Levanter (2019)

Singles from Clé 2: Yellow Wood
- 1. "Side Effects" Released: June 19, 2019

Clé 2: Yellow Wood is the first special album and fifth extended play by South Korean boy group Stray Kids. It was released digitally and physically on June 19, 2019, by JYP Entertainment and distributed through Dreamus. The album consists of three new songs, including the single "부작용 (Side Effects)", alongside all four "Mixtape" songs, available previously only on the physical CD releases of their previous four EPs. This is the last release to feature former member Woojin, who departed the band months after its release.

== Track listing ==
No.	Title	Lyrics	Music	Arrangement	Length
1.	"Road Not Taken" (밟힌 적 없는 길 (Note: Balbhin jeok omneun gil lit. "A road that has never been trampled on"))	3Racha (Note: Normally in track's credit, 3Racha is separated as Bang Chan (3Racha), Changbin (3Racha), and Han (3Racha).)	Matthew Tishler; Andrew Underberg; Crash Cove	Matthew Tishler; Crash Cove	1:36
2.	"Side Effects" (부작용 (Note: Pronounce Bujagyong))	3Racha	3Racha; Tak; 1Take	Tak; 1Take	3:14
3.	"TMT" (별생각 (Note: Byeolsaenggak lit. "Particular thought" or "Many thoughts"))	3Racha	3Racha; Time; Grvvity	Time; Grvvity	3:27
4.	"Mixtape #1"	Stray Kids	3Racha	collapsedone	4:13
5.	"Mixtape #2"	Stray Kids	Stray Kids	Bang Chan (3Racha)	4:52
6.	"Mixtape #3"	Stray Kids	Stray Kids	Bang Chan (3Racha); Doplamingo	4:18
7.	"Mixtape #4"	Stray Kids	Stray Kids	Bang Chan (3Racha); Versachoi	3:51
Total length:					25:31

== Charts ==
=== Weekly charts ===
Chart (2019)	Peak position
French Download Albums (SNEP)	69
Japanese Albums (Oricon)	17
Japanese Combined Albums (Oricon)	23
Japanese Download Albums (Billboard)	86
Polish Albums (ZPAV)	12
South Korean Albums (Gaon)	2
Spanish Albums (Promusicae)	93
UK Independent Album Breakers (OCC)	17
US Heatseekers Albums (Billboard)	17
US Independent Albums (Billboard)	50
US World Albums (Billboard)	9

=== Year-end charts ===
Chart (2019)	Position
South Korean Albums (Gaon)	38

== Certifications ==
Certifications for Clé 2: Yellow Wood
Region	Certification	Certified units/sales
South Korea (KMCA)	Platinum	250,000^{^}
^{^} Shipments figures based on certification alone.

== Accolades ==
Year-end lists
Critic/Publication	List	Song	Rank	Ref.
Dazed	The 20 best K-pop songs of 2019	"Side Effects"	1	
