= I Am Who =

EP by Stray Kids
- Released: August 6, 2018
- Recorded: 2018
- Studio: Ji-sang's Studio; JYPE Studios; The Vibe Studio
- Genre: K-pop; hip-hop
- Length: 26:24
- Language: Korean; English
- Label: JYP; Iriver
- Producer: 3Racha; earattack; Gong-do; Hong Ji-sang; HotSauce; Kim Mung-e; Larmook; Space One; Trippy

Stray Kids chronology
I Am Not (2018)	I Am Who (2018)	I Am You (2018)

Singles from I Am Who
- 1. "My Pace" Released: August 6, 2018; 2. "Awkward Silence" Released: August 27, 2018

I Am Who (stylized as I am WHO) is the second extended play by South Korean boy group Stray Kids. The EP was released digitally and physically on August 6, 2018, by JYP Entertainment. A showcase titled Stray Kids Unveil: Op. 02: I Am Who was held the day before the release. The album sold 79,684 physical copies in the month of August.

The album was released in two versions—an "I am" version and a "WHO" version.

== Track listing ==
Credits adapted from Melon

I Am Who — Digital EP
No.	Title	Lyrics	Music	Arrangement	Length
1.	"WHO?"	Woojin; Han (3Racha); Felix	Woojin; Han (3Racha); Felix; Hong Ji-sang	Hong Ji-sang	1:44
2.	"My Pace"	3Racha (Note: Normally in track's credit, 3Racha is separated as Bang Chan (3Racha), Changbin (3Racha), and Han (3Racha).); J. Y. Park "The Asiansoul" (Note: signifies an additional lyricist)	3Racha; earattack; Larmook	earattack; Larmook; Gong-do	3:09
3.	"Voices"	3Racha	3Racha; Trippy	Bang Chan (3Racha); Trippy	3:20
4.	"Question"	3Racha	3Racha; HotSauce	HotSauce	3:02
5.	"Insomnia" (불면증 (Note: pronounce Bulmyeonjeung))	3Racha	3Racha; KZ; Space One	Space One	3:26
6.	"M.I.A."	3Racha	3Racha; Kim Mong-e	Bang Chan (3Racha); Kim Mong-e	3:30
7.	"Awkward Silence" (갑자기 분위기 싸해질 필요 없잖아요 (Note: Gapjagi Bunwigi Ssahaejil Piryo Eopjanayo lit. "No need to keep awkward silence"))	3Racha	3Racha; Time	Time	3:13
Total length:					21:30

I Am Who — Physical EP bonus track
No.	Title	Lyrics	Music	Arrangement	Length
8.	"Mixtape #2"	Stray Kids	Stray Kids	Bang Chan (3Racha)	4:52
Total length:					26:24

== Charts ==
=== Weekly charts ===
Chart (2018–25)	Peak position
Croatian International Albums (HDU)	25
French Download Albums (SNEP)	81
Hungarian Albums (MAHASZ)	29
Japanese Albums (Oricon)	34
South Korean Albums (Gaon)	3
US Heatseekers Albums (Billboard)	15
US Independent Albums (Billboard)	36
US World Albums (Billboard)	5

=== Year-end charts ===
Chart (2018)	Position
South Korean Albums (Gaon)	52

== Certifications ==
Certifications and sales figures for I Am Who
Region	Certification	Certified units/sales
South Korea (KMCA)	Platinum	250,000^{^}
^{^} Shipments figures based on certification alone.
