= Clé: Levanter =

- Digital cover

EP by Stray Kids
- Released: December 9, 2019
- Recorded: 2019
- Studio: The Vibe Studio; RCAVE Sound; W Sound; Ji-sang’s Studio; Ingrid Studio; 821 Sound
- Genre: Hip-hop; EDM; K-pop
- Length: 27:20
- Language: Korean; English
- Label: JYP; Dreamus
- Producer: 3Racha; Cook Classics; Lorenzo Cosi; Crash Cove; DallasK; Hong Ji-sang; Josh Wei; Nick Lee; Henrik Nordenback; Matthew Tishler; YK Koi

Stray Kids chronology
Clé 2: Yellow Wood (2019)	Clé: Levanter (2019)	Step Out of Clé (2020)

Singles from Clé: Levanter
- 1. "Double Knot" Released: October 9, 2019; 2. "Astronaut" Released: November 14, 2019; 3. "Levanter" Released: December 9, 2019

Clé: Levanter (stylized as Clé : LEVANTER) is the fifth extended play (sixth overall) by South Korean boy group Stray Kids. It was released on December 9, 2019, by JYP Entertainment and distributed through Dreamus. The EP spawned three singles. Its lead single, "Double Knot", was released on October 9, 2019, followed by "Astronaut" on November 14, 2019, and the title track "Levanter" on the same day as the EP released date.

The EP was originally set to be released on November 25, 2019, but was delayed to December 9, 2019, due to member Woojin's departure from the group on October 27, 2019. Woojin's departure resulted in the group having to re-record the songs on the EP without Woojin's voice as well as having to re-organize the choreographies shortly before the album drop.

== Background ==
On the half of October with the success of its lead single of "Double Knot", JYP announced that the group will held Olympic Hall starting November 23–24, with their upcoming mini-album Clé: Levanter will be released on November 25.

Following Woojin's departure was announced on October 27, the release date was pushed back to December as a result. Concept teasers were released on November 27 following the music video teasers on December 6–7 and the full music video release on December 9.

== Commercial performance ==
Clé: Levanter was a success in term of album sales, debuting atop the Gaon Album Chart and topping the chart for two consecutive weeks. The EP became the second best-selling album for the December issue of Gaon Monthly Album Chart with 182,300 copies sold. The EP also charted at number 30 of Gaon Year-End Album Chart for 2019, became the best-selling album of the group in 2019.

== Track listing ==
Clé: Levanter – Digital EP
No.	Title	Lyrics	Music	Arrangement	Length
1.	"Stop"	3Racha (Note: Normally in track's credit, 3Racha is separated as Bang Chan (3Racha), Changbin (3Racha), and Han (3Racha).)	3Racha; Matthew Tishler; Andrew Underberg; Crash Cove	Matthew Tishler; Crash Cove	3:10
2.	"Double Knot"	3Racha	3Racha; Nick Furlong; Dallas Koehlke	DallasK; Bang Chan (3Racha)	3:10
3.	"Levanter" (바람 (Note: Baram lit. "Wind"))	3Racha; J.Y. Park "The Asiansoul"; Herz Analog	3Racha; Hong Ji-sang	Hong Ji-sang	3:16
4.	"Booster"	3Racha	Christian Fast; Henrik Nordenback; Albin Nordqvist	Henrik Nordenback	3:41
5.	"Astronaut"	3Racha	3Racha; Lorenzo Cosi; YK Koi	Lorenzo Cosi; YK Koi	2:59
6.	"Sunshine"	Han (3Racha)	Han (3Racha); Nicholas Lee; Joshua Wei	Nicholas Lee; Joshua Wei	3:42
7.	"You Can Stay"	3Racha	3Racha; Cook Classics	Cook Classics	3:28
Total length:					23:25

Clé: Levanter – Physical EP bonus track
No.	Title	Lyrics	Music	Arrangement	Length
8.	"Mixtape #5"	Stray Kids	Stray Kids	Edmmer; ALOM	3:54
Total length:					27:16

== Charts ==
=== Weekly charts ===
Chart (2019–2021)	Peak position
Belgian Albums (Ultratop Flanders)	132
Belgian Albums (Ultratop Wallonia)	138
Hungarian Albums (MAHASZ)	15
Japanese Albums (Oricon)	17
Japanese Combined Albums (Oricon)	20
Japanese Download Albums (Billboard)	67
Spanish Albums (Promusicae)	85
South Korean Albums (Gaon)	1
UK Album Downloads (OCC)	86
US Heatseekers Albums (Billboard)	18
US World Albums (Billboard)	9

=== Year-end charts ===
Chart (2019)	Position
Hungarian Albums (MAHASZ)	79
South Korean Albums (Gaon)	30

== Certifications ==
Certifications for Clé: Levanter
Region	Certification	Certified units/sales
South Korea (KMCA)	2× Platinum	500,000^{^}
^{^} Shipments figures based on certification alone.

== Accolades ==
Music program wins
Song	Program	Date	Ref.
"Levanter"	M Countdown (Mnet)	December 19, 2019	
