= Clé 1: Miroh =

EP by Stray Kids
- Released: March 25, 2019
- Recorded: 2018–19
- Studio: Kairos Music Group LLC; The Vibe Studio; 821 Sound; W Sound
- Genre: Hip-hop; EDM; K-pop
- Length: 25:23
- Language: Korean; English
- Label: JYP; Iriver
- Producer: 3Racha; Brian Atwood; earattack; Glory Face; Jake K; J;Key; Kairos; K.O; Larmook; samUIL; Versachoi

Stray Kids chronology
I Am You (2018)	Clé 1: Miroh (2019)	Clé 2: Yellow Wood (2019)

Singles from Clé 1: Miroh
- 1. "Miroh" Released: March 25, 2019

Clé 1: Miroh (stylized as Clé 1 : MIROH) is the fourth extended play by South Korean boy group Stray Kids. The EP was released digitally and physically on March 25, 2019, by JYP Entertainment and distributed through Iriver. The release of the EP was in conjunction with the first anniversary of the group's debut.

It is with the single "Miroh" that Stray Kids obtained their first win on the music show M Countdown.

== Promotion ==
To promote the release of the EP, JYP Entertainment announced on March 7 that the group would travel around South Korea to meet with fans, titled "Hi-Stay Tour in Korea". The group visited Busan, Daejeon, and Incheon prior to the album's release, and followed it with a special event in Seoul on April 4.

== Track listing ==
Clé 1: Miroh – Digital EP
No.	Title	Lyrics	Music	Arrangement	Length
1.	"Entrance"		Bang Chan (3Racha); Kairos; samUIL	Bang Chan (3Racha); Kairos; samUIL; K.O	1:38
2.	"Miroh"	3Racha (Note: Normally in track's credit, 3Racha is separated as Bang Chan (3Racha), Changbin (3Racha), and Han (3Racha).)	3Racha; Brian Atwood	Brian Atwood; Bang Chan (3Racha)	3:27
3.	"Victory Song" (승전가 (Note: Pronounce Seungjeon-ga))	3Racha	3Racha; earattack; Larmook	earattack; Larmook	3:16
4.	"Maze of Memories" (잠깐의 고요 (Note: Jamkkan-ui goyo lit. "Moment of silence"))	3Racha	3Racha; J;Key	J;Key; Bang Chan (3Racha)	2:55
5.	"Boxer"	3Racha	3Racha; Glory Face; Jake K	Glory Face; Jake K	3:20
6.	"Chronosaurus"	3Racha	Bang Chan (3Racha); Kairos; samUIL	Kairos; samUIL; K.O	3:18
7.	"19"	Han (3Racha)	Bang Chan (3Racha); Han (3Racha)	Chan	3:25
Total length:					21:30

Clé 1: Miroh – Physical EP bonus track
No.	Title	Lyrics	Music	Arrangement	Length
8.	"Mixtape #4"	Stray Kids	Stray Kids	Versachoi; Bang Chan (3Racha)	3:51
Total length:					25:23

== Charts ==
=== Weekly charts ===
Chart (2019–20)	Peak position
French Download Albums (SNEP)	47
Hungarian Albums (MAHASZ)	19
Japanese Albums (Oricon)	15
Japanese Combined Albums (Oricon)	18
Japanese Download Albums (Billboard)	69
South Korean Albums (Gaon)	1
UK Album Downloads (OCC)	63
UK Independent Album Breakers (OCC)	18
US Heatseekers Albums (Billboard)	13
US Independent Albums (Billboard)	30
US World Albums (Billboard)	3

=== Year-end charts ===
Chart (2019)	Position
South Korean Albums (Gaon)	31

== Certifications ==
Certifications for Clé 1: Miroh
Region	Certification	Certified units/sales
South Korea (KMCA)	Platinum	250,000^{^}
^{^} Shipments figures based on certification alone.

== Accolades ==
Year-end lists
Critic/Publication	List	Song	Rank	Ref.
BuzzFeed	Best K-pop Music Videos of 2019	"Miroh"	5	
Elite Daily	These Songs About Winning Are Perfect; For Your Super Bowl Playlist	"Victory Song"	13	
MTV	The Best K-pop B-sides of 2019	"Chronosaurus"	8	
