= I Am You (EP) =

EP by Stray Kids
- Released: October 22, 2018
- Recorded: 2018
- Studios: Ji-sang's Studio; The Vibe Studio
- Genres: K-pop; hip-hop
- Length: 25:50
- Languages: Korean; English
- Labels: JYP; Iriver
- Producers: 3Racha; Collapsedone; Doplamingo; Frants; Lee Hae-sol; Hong Ji-sang; Justin Reinstein; Slo; Song Ha-eun; Yong Jong-sung

Stray Kids chronology
I Am Who (2018)	I Am You (2018)	Clé 1: Miroh (2019)

Singles from I Am You
- 1. "I Am You" Released: October 22, 2018; 2. "Get Cool" Released: November 14, 2018

I Am You (stylized as I am YOU) is the third extended play by South Korean boy group Stray Kids. The EP was released digitally and physically on October 22, 2018, by JYP Entertainment and distributed through Iriver. A showcase titled Stray Kids Unveil: Op. 03: I Am You was held the day before the release at Olympic Hall. The album sold 76,547 physical copies in the month of October.

The album was released in two versions—an “I am” version and a “YOU” version.

== Track listing ==
Credits adapted from Melon

I Am You — Digital EP
No.	Title	Lyrics	Music	Arrangement	Length
1.	"You."	Changbin (3Racha); Hyunjin; I.N	Changbin (3Racha); Hyunjin; I.N; Hong Ji-sang	Hong Ji-sang	1:19
2.	"I Am You"	3Racha (Note: Normally in track's credit, 3Racha is separated as Bang Chan (3Racha), Changbin (3Racha), and Han (3Racha).)	3Racha; Lee Woo-min 'Collapsedone'; Justin Reinstein; KZ; Zene The Zilla	Lee Woo-min 'Collapsedone'; Justin Reinstein	3:25
3.	"My Side" (편 (Note: Pyeon lit. "Side"))	3Racha	3Racha; Frants	Frants	3:37
4.	"Hero's Soup" (해장국 (Note: Haejang-guk lit. "Hangover soup"))	3Racha	3Racha; Lee Hae-sol	Lee Hae-sol	3:33
5.	"Get Cool"	3Racha; Inner Child	Yong Jong-sung; Inner Child; Song Ha-eun; Totem; 3Racha	Yong Jong-sung; Song Ha-eun	3:15
6.	"N/S" (극과 극 (Note: Geukgwa geuk lit. "(North) pole and (south) pole"))	3Racha	3Racha; Slo	Slo	3:45
7.	"0325"	3Racha	3Racha; Hong Ji-sang	Hong Ji-sang	3:39
Total length:					22:30

I Am You — Physical EP bonus track
No.	Title	Lyrics	Music	Arrangement	Length
8.	"Mixtape #3"	Stray Kids	Stray Kids	Bang Chan (3Racha); Doplamingo	4:20
Total length:					25:50

== Charts ==
=== Weekly charts ===
Chart (2018–2025)	Peak position
French Download Albums (SNEP)	124
Japanese Albums (Oricon)	17
Hungarian Albums (MAHASZ)	25
Portuguese Albums (AFP)	176
South Korean Albums (Gaon)	2
US Heatseekers Albums (Billboard)	20
US World Albums (Billboard)	8

=== Year-end charts ===
Chart (2018)	Position
South Korean Albums (Gaon)	44

== Certifications ==
Certifications and sales figures for I Am You
Region	Certification	Certified units/sales
South Korea (KMCA)	Platinum	250,000^{^}
^{^} Shipments figures based on certification alone.
