= Stray Kids discography =

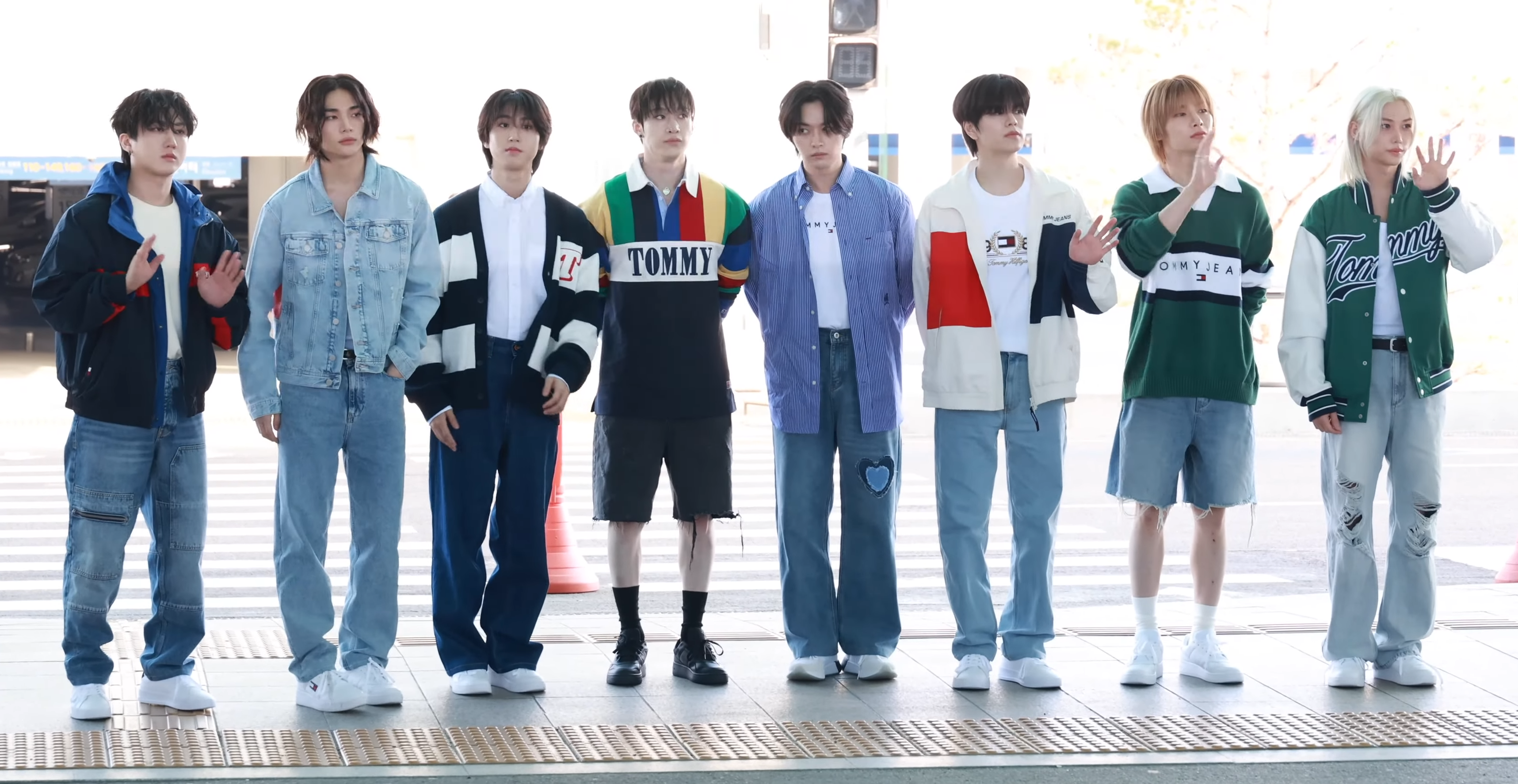
- Stray Kids in May 2024
- Studio albums: 6
- EPs: 16
- Compilation albums: 5
- Singles: 46
- Promotional singles: 8
- Video albums: 6
- Music videos: 99
- Reissues: 1
- Mixtapes: 2
- Single albums: 3

South Korean boy band Stray Kids have released six studio albums (four Korean and two Japanese), five compilation albums, one reissue, sixteen extended plays (twelve Korean and four Japanese), two mixtapes, three single albums, and forty six singles. As of May 2026, Stray Kids has sold over 40 million album shipments; 36 million were Korean releases and 4 million were Japanese releases. The International Federation of the Phonographic Industry (IFPI) ranked Stray Kids as the seventh best-selling artist globally of 2022, the third of 2023, the fifth of 2024, and the second in 2025.

Following the completion of the eponymous survival show in 2017, Stray Kids released an extended play (EP) Mixtape which debuted at number two on Gaon Album Chart and Billboard World Albums chart. The group officially debuted in 2018 with EP I Am Not, followed by other two I Am series EPs, I Am Who and I Am You. In 2019, Stray Kids released Clé series EPs: Clé 1: Miroh, Clé 2: Yellow Wood, and Clé: Levanter. The group earned their first South Korean music program win with the fourth EP's lead single "Miroh".

Stray Kids debuted in Japan with the Japanese version of "Levanter", "Double Knot", and "My Pace", as well as the re-recorded version of their songs from the previous album compiled in the compilation album SKZ2020. The album debuted at number three on both the Oricon Albums Chart and Billboard Japan Hot Albums. The group also released its first Japanese single "Top" and its B-side "Slump" which was used as the opening and ending theme of the anime Kami no Tō -Tower of God-. The single debuted at number one on the Japanese Oricon Singles Chart, making Stray Kids the fourth foreign male artists to debut at number one on the chart with their first single. Not long after, the group released its first Japanese EP All In which debuted at number two on the Oricon Albums Chart and Billboard Japan Hot Albums.

Stray Kids' first studio album Go Live debuted at number one on the weekly Gaon Album Chart, sold 243,462 copies by the end of the month, and peaked at number five on the monthly Gaon Album Chart. The Korea Music Content Association (KMCA) certified the album platinum in August 2020, the group's first album to achieve this. Its lead single "God's Menu" became the group's first single to be certified gold by Recording Industry Association of America (RIAA). The second studio album Noeasy became Stray Kids' first million-selling album in August 2021, made the group to be the first JYP Entertainment artist to sell more than one million copies of an album. Its lead single "Thunderous" peaked at number 33 on Gaon Digital Chart and at number 80 on Billboard Global 200, and earned six wins on music programs.

In February 2022, Stray Kids signed to Republic Records for promotions in the United States. After that, the group released four EPs, two studio albums, and two mixtapes: Oddinary, Maxident (both 2022), 5-Star, Rock-Star (both 2023), Ate, Hop (both 2024), Karma, and Do It (both 2025), and This & That (2026); all nine releases peaked at number one on the US Billboard 200, making them the first act to debut at the top of the chart with their first nine charting releases. Maxident became Stray Kids' and JYPE's first album to sell over two million and three million copies, and be certified triple million by KMCA. On June 1, 2023, 5-Star had exceeded 5.13 million pre-orders and noted as the first release to achieved more than 5 million pre-orders in K-pop history. "Lalalala" from Rock-Star became the group's first entry on the US Billboard Hot 100 at number 90. In November 2025, Stray Kids was noted as K-Pop artist who has the most RIAA Gold Albums (6 albums).

== Albums ==
=== Studio albums ===
List of studio albums, showing selected details, selected chart positions, sales figures, and certifications
Title	Details	Peak chart positions										Sales	Certifications
Title	Details	KOR	AUS	CAN	FRA	GER	JPN	NZ	UK	US	US World	Sales	Certifications
Go Live	Released: June 17, 2020; Label: JYP; Formats: CD, DL, streaming	1	—	—	54	13	6	—	— (Note: Go Live did not enter the UK Albums Chart, but peaked at number 69 on the Album Downloads Chart.)	— (Note: Go Live did not enter the Billboard 200, but peaked at number 26 on the Top Album Sales.)	4	KOR: 876,460; JPN: 46,090	KMCA: 3× Platinum
Noeasy	Released: August 23, 2021; Label: JYP; Formats: CD, DL, streaming	1	14	—	— (Note: Noeasy did not enter the SNEP Top Albums, but peaked at number 63 on the Top Physical Albums.)	64	2	—	— (Note: Noeasy did not enter the UK Albums Chart, but peaked at number 5 on the Album Downloads Chart.)	— (Note: Noeasy did not enter the Billboard 200, but peaked at number 69 on the Top Current Album Sales.)	5	KOR: 2,126,039; JPN: 54,169 (Note: Combined Japan sales for Noeasy: Physical sales: 53,300; Digital sales: 869); US: 16,100	KMCA: 2× Million
The Sound	Released: February 22, 2023; Label: Epic Japan; Formats: CD, CD+BD, DL, streaming	—	—	—	—	—	1	—	— (Note: The Sound did not enter the UK Albums Chart, but peaked at number 87 on the Album Downloads Chart.)	—	—	JPN: 471,063 (Note: Combined Japan sales for The Sound: Physical sales: 468,811; Digital sales: 2,252)	RIAJ: 2× Platinum (phy.)
5-Star	Released: June 2, 2023; Label: JYP, Republic; Formats: CD, DL, streaming	1	2	10	1	2	2	7	40	1	1	KOR: 5,357,008; JPN: 211,676 (Note: Combined Japan sales for 5-Star: Physical sales: 207,554; Digital sales: 4,122); US: 526,000; WW: 5,300,000	KMCA: 5× Million; RIAA: Gold; SNEP: Gold
Giant	Released: November 13, 2024; Label: Epic Japan; Formats: CD, CD+BD, DL, streaming	—	—	—	—	—	1	—	— (Note: Giant did not enter the UK Albums Chart, but peaked at number 19 on the Album Downloads Chart.)	—	—	JPN: 509,279 (Note: Combined Japan sales for Giant: Physical sales: 506,266; Digital sales: 3,013)	RIAJ: 2× Platinum (phy.)
Karma	Released: August 22, 2025; Label: JYP, Republic; Formats: CD, LP, DL, streaming	1	3	11	1	1	1	7	22	1	1	KOR: 3,901,003; JPN: 403,085 (Note: Combined Japan sales for Karma: Physical: 400,033; Digital: 3,052); US: 585,000; WW: 3,490,000	KMCA: 3× Million; KMCA: Platinum (Nemo); RIAA: Gold; SNEP: Gold
"—" denotes releases that did not chart or were not released in that region.

=== Compilation albums ===
List of compilation albums, showing selected details, selected chart positions, sales figures, and certifications
Title	Details	Peak positions				Sales	Certifications
Title	Details	FRA	JPN	UK DL	US World	Sales	Certifications
Unveil Stray Kids	Released: September 19, 2019; Label: Epic Japan; Formats: DL, streaming; Track listing: 1. "Hellevator"; 2. "District 9"; 3. "My Pace"; 4. "I Am You"; 5. "Get Cool"; 6. "Miroh"; 7. "Victory Song"; 8. "Side Effects"; 9. "Grow Up"	—	—	—	—		
SKZ2020	Released: March 18, 2020; Label: Epic Japan; Formats: CD, CD+DVD, CS, DL, streaming	—	3	—	14	JPN: 36,347; US: 1,000	RIAJ: Gold (phy.)
SKZ2021	Released: December 23, 2021; Label: JYP; Formats: DL, streaming	—	—	—	—	JPN: 959	
SKZ-Replay	Released: December 21, 2022; Label: JYP, Republic; Formats: DL, streaming	—	—	28	11	JPN: 2,566	
SKZ-Replay 2026 Pt.1	Released: August 1, 2026; Label: JYP, Republic; Formats: DL, streaming	187	—	17	10	JPN: 1,463	
"—" denotes releases that did not chart or were not released in that region.

=== Reissues ===
List of reissues, showing selected details, chart positions, sales, and certifications
Title	Details	Peak chart positions				Sales	Certifications
Title	Details	KOR	UK DL	US Heat.	US World	Sales	Certifications
In Life	Released: September 14, 2020; Label: JYP; Formats: CD, DL, streaming	1	53	4	4	KOR: 831,062; US: 8,000	KMCA: 3× Platinum

== Extended plays ==
List of extended plays, showing selected details, selected chart positions, sales figures, and certifications
Title	Details	Peak chart positions										Sales	Certifications
Title	Details	KOR	AUS	CAN	FRA	GER	JPN	NZ	UK	US	US World	Sales	Certifications
Mixtape	Released: January 8, 2018; Label: JYP; Formats: CD, DL, streaming	2	—	—	—	—	47	— (Note: Mixtape did not enter the NZ Official Top 40 Albums, but peaked at number nine on the NZ Heatseeker Albums)	—	— (Note: Mixtape did not enter the Billboard 200, but peaked at number six on the Heatseekers Albums.)	2	KOR: 174,743; JPN: 1,063	KMCA: Platinum
I Am Not	Released: March 26, 2018; Label: JYP; Formats: CD, DL, streaming	4	—	—	— (Note: I Am Not did not enter the SNEP Top Albums, but peaked at number 155 on the Top Download Albums.)	—	61	— (Note: I Am Not did not enter the NZ Official Top 40 Albums, but peaked at number nine on the NZ Heatseeker Albums.)	—	— (Note: I Am Not did not enter the Billboard 200, but peaked at number 23 on the Heatseekers Albums.)	5	KOR: 337,165; JPN: 2,036	KMCA: Platinum
I Am Who	Released: August 6, 2018; Label: JYP; Formats: CD, DL, streaming	3	—	—	— (Note: I Am Who did not enter the SNEP Top Albums, but peaked at number 81 on the Top Download Albums.)	—	34	—	—	— (Note: I Am Who did not enter the Billboard 200, but peaked at number 15 on the Heatseekers Albums.)	5	KOR: 313,023; JPN: 1,474	KMCA: Platinum
I Am You	Released: October 22, 2018; Label: JYP; Formats: CD, DL, streaming	2	—	—	— (Note: I Am You did not enter the SNEP Top Albums, but peaked at number 81 on the Top Download Albums.)	—	34	—	—	— (Note: I Am You did not enter the Billboard 200, but peaked at number 16 on the Heatseekers Albums.)	8	KOR: 345,630; JPN: 2,234; US: 2,000	KMCA: Platinum
Clé 1: Miroh	Released: March 25, 2019; Label: JYP; Formats: CD, DL, streaming	1	—	—	— (Note: Clé 1: Miroh did not enter the SNEP Top Albums, but peaked at number 47 on the Top Download Albums.)	—	15	—	— (Note: Clé 1: Miroh did not enter the UK Albums Chart, but peaked at number 63 on the Album Downloads Chart.)	— (Note: Clé 1: Miroh did not enter the Billboard 200, but peaked at number 13 on the Heatseekers Albums.)	3	KOR: 367,314; JPN: 5,856; US: 1,000	KMCA: Platinum
Clé 2: Yellow Wood	Released: June 19, 2019; Label: JYP; Formats: CD, DL, streaming	2	—	—	— (Note: Clé 2: Yellow Wood did not enter the SNEP Top Albums, but peaked at number 69 on the Top Download Albums.)	—	17	—	—	— (Note: Clé 2: Yellow Wood did not enter the Billboard 200, but peaked at number 17 on the Heatseekers Albums.)	9	KOR: 266,925; JPN: 3,379	KMCA: Platinum
Clé: Levanter	Released: December 9, 2019; Label: JYP; Formats: CD, DL, streaming	1	—	—	—	—	17	—	— (Note: Clé: Levanter did not enter the UK Albums Chart, but peaked at number 63 on the Album Downloads Chart.)	— (Note: Clé: Levanter did not enter the Billboard 200, but peaked at number 18 on the Heatseekers Albums.)	9	KOR: 445,996; JPN: 9,116	KMCA: 2× Platinum
All In	Released: November 4, 2020; Label: Epic Japan; Formats: CD, CD+DVD, DL, streaming	—	—	—	—	—	2	—	—	—	—	JPN: 59,361 (Note: Combined Japan sales for All In: Physical sales: 58,927; Digital sales: 434)	RIAJ: Gold (phy.)
Oddinary	Released: March 18, 2022; Label: JYP, Republic; Formats: CD, DL, streaming	1	92	20	— (Note: Oddinary did not enter the SNEP Top Albums, but peaked at number 63 on the Top Physical Albums.)	43	4	33	95	1	1	KOR: 2,218,221; JPN: 64,464 (Note: Combined Japan sales for Oddinary: Physical sales: 63,447; Digital sales: 1,017); US: 204,000	KMCA: 2× Million
Circus	Released: June 22, 2022; Label: Epic Japan; Formats: CD, CD+DVD, DL, streaming	—	— (Note: Circus did not enter the ARIA Top 100 Albums Chart, but peaked at number 12 on the Physical Albums Chart.)	—	—	—	2	—	—	—	—	JPN: 151,840 (Note: Combined Japan sales for Circus in Oricon: Physical sales: 150,847; Digital sales: 993)	RIAJ: Platinum (phy.)
Maxident	Released: October 7, 2022; Label: JYP, Republic; Formats: CD, DL, streaming	1	4	18	99	73	3	9	85	1	1	KOR: 3,900,928; JPN: 106,801 (Note: Combined Japan sales for Maxident: Physical sales: 104,863; Digital sales: 1,938); US: 200,500	KMCA: 3× Million; RIAA: Gold
Social Path / Super Bowl (Japanese Ver.)	Released: September 6, 2023; Label: Epic Japan; Formats: CD, CD+BD, DL, streaming	—	—	—	—	—	1	—	—	—	—	JPN: 709,710 (Note: Combined Japan sales for Social Path / Super Bowl (Japanese Ver.): Physical sales: 708,963; Digital sales: 747)	RIAJ: Million (phy.)
Rock-Star	Released: November 10, 2023; Label: JYP, Republic; Formats: CD, DL, streaming	1	2	21	2	2	1	11	69	1	1	KOR: 4,472,143; JPN: 229,835 (Note: Combined Japan sales for Rock-Star: Physical sales: 225,897; Digital sales: 3,938); US: 490,000; WW: 4,200,000	KMCA: 4× Million; RIAA: Gold; SNEP: Gold
Ate	Released: July 19, 2024; Label: JYP, Republic; Formats: CD, DL, streaming	1	2	21	1	2	2	9	62	1	1	KOR: 3,328,815; JPN: 247,103 (Note: Combined Japan sales for Ate: Physical sales: 243,011; Digital sales: 4,092); US: 449,000; WW: 2,900,000	KMCA: 3× Million; RIAA: Gold; SNEP: Gold
Hollow	Released: June 18, 2025; Label: Epic Japan; Formats: CD, CD+Blu-ray, DL, streaming	—	—	—	—	—	1	—	—	—	18	JPN: 700,429 (Note: Combined Japan sales for Hollow: Physical sales: 696,271; Digital sales: 4,158)	RIAJ: 3× Platinum (phy.)
This & That	Released: August 7, 2026; Label: JYP, Republic; Format: CD, Mini CD, LP, DL, streaming	1	3	9	1	2	1	7	80	1	1	KOR: 3,815,576; JPN: 244,583 (Note: Combined Japan sales for This & That: Physical sales: 242,076; Digital sales: 2,507); US: 357,000	KMCA: 3× Million; KMCA: 2× Platinum (Fans); SNEP: Gold
Suiatsu	Scheduled: November 25, 2026; Label: Epic Japan; Format: CD+Blu-ray, CD, DL, streaming	To be released											
"—" denotes releases that did not chart or were not released in that region.

== Mixtapes ==
List of mixtapes, showing selected details, chart positions, sales, and certifications
Title	Details	Peak chart positions										Sales	Certifications
Title	Details	KOR	AUS	CAN	FRA	GER	JPN	NZ	UK	US	US World	Sales	Certifications
Hop	Released: December 13, 2024; Label: JYP, Republic; Formats: CD, DL, streaming	1	4	62	3	3	1	20	91	1	1	KOR: 2,356,343; JPN: 157,003 (Note: Cumulative sales in Japan for Hop: Physical: 154,590; Digital: 2,413); US: 471,000; WW: 1,800,000	KMCA: 2× Million; RIAA: Gold; SNEP: Gold
Do It	Released: November 21, 2025; Label: JYP, Republic; Formats: CD, DL, streaming	1	10	14	3	3	3	23	—	1	1	KOR: 2,823,763; JPN: 122,878 (Note: Cumulative sales for Do It in Japan: Physical: 120,266; Digital: 2,612); US: 456,000	KMCA: 2× Million; KMCA: Platinum (Nemo); SNEP: Gold
"—" denotes releases that did not chart or were not released in that region.

== Single albums ==
List of single albums, showing selected details, selected chart positions, sales figures, and certifications
Title	Details	Peaks			Sales	Certifications
Title	Details	KOR	FRA	US Heat.	Sales	Certifications
Step Out of Clé	Released: January 24, 2020; Label: JYP; Formats: DL, streaming	—	—	—		
Christmas EveL	Released: November 29, 2021; Label: JYP; Formats: CD, DL, streaming	1	—	25	KOR: 980,370	KMCA: Million
Mixtape: Dominate	Released: March 21, 2025; Label: JYP, Republic; Formats: DL, streaming	—	191	—	JPN: 3,835 (dig.)	
"—" denotes releases that did not chart or were not released in that region.

== Singles ==
=== As lead artist ===
List of singles as lead artist, showing year released, selected chart positions, certifications, and name of the album
Title	Year	Peak chart positions										Certifications	Album
Title	Year	KOR	AUS	CAN	JPN Cmb.	JPN Hot	NZ Hot	UK	US	US World	WW	Certifications	Album
"Hellevator"	2017	—	—	—	—	—	—	—	—	6	—		Mixtape
"District 9"	2018	—	—	—	—	—	—	—	—	10	—		I Am Not
"My Pace"	2018	—	—	—	— (Note: "My Pace" (Japanese version) did not enter the Oricon Combined Singles Chart, but peaked at number 21 on the Streaming Chart.)	90	—	—	—	8	—		I Am Who
"I Am You"	2018	—	—	—	—	—	—	—	—	19	—		I Am You
"Miroh"	2019	—	—	—	—	—	—	—	—	2	—	RIAJ: Gold (st.)	Clé 1: Miroh
"Side Effects"	2019	—	—	—	—	—	—	—	—	16	—		Clé 2: Yellow Wood
"Double Knot"	2019	—	—	—	— (Note: "Double Knot" (Japanese version) did not enter the Oricon Combined Singles Chart, but peaked at number 25 on the Streaming Chart.)	— (Note: "Double Knot" did not enter the Billboard Japan Hot 100, but peaked at number 48 on the Streaming Songs.)	—	—	—	4	—		Clé: Levanter
"Levanter"	2019	—	—	—	—	—	—	—	—	5	—		Clé: Levanter
"Mixtape: Gone Days"	2019	—	—	—	—	—	—	—	—	8	—		Go Live
"Mixtape: On Track"	2020	—	—	—	—	—	—	—	—	13	—		Go Live
"Top"	2020	—	—	—	1	8	—	—	—	10	—	RIAJ: Gold (phy.)	Go Live and All In
"God's Menu"	2020	— (Note: "God's Menu" did not enter the Gaon Digital Chart, but peaked at number 144 on the component Download Chart.)	—	—	—	—	24	—	—	4	—	BPI: Silver; RIAA: Platinum; RIAJ: Gold (st.)	Go Live
"Back Door"	2020	— (Note: "Back Door" did not enter the Gaon Digital Chart, but peaked at number 11 on the component Download Chart and number 45 on the component BGM Chart.)	—	—	—	—	23	—	—	2	169	RIAA: Gold; RIAJ: Gold (st.)	In Life
"All In"	2020	—	—	—	—	67	—	—	—	21	—		All In
"Going Dumb" (with Alesso and Corsak)	2021	— (Note: "Going Dumb" did not enter the Gaon Digital Chart, but peaked at number 178 on the component Download Chart.)	—	—	—	—	—	—	—	—	—		Non-album single
"Mixtape: Oh"	2021	— (Note: "Mixtape: Oh" did not enter the Gaon Digital Chart, but peaked at number 18 on the component Download Chart, and number 97 on the component BGM Chart.)	—	—	—	— (Note: "Mixtape: Oh" did not enter the Billboard Japan Hot 100, but peaked at number 59 on the Download Songs.)	—	—	—	1	—		Noeasy
"Thunderous"	2021	33	—	—	2	66	—	— (Note: "Thunderous" did not enter the UK Singles Chart, but peaked at number 82 on the Singles Sales Chart.)	—	3	80	RIAA: Gold; RIAJ: Platinum (phy.); Gold (st.)	Noeasy and The Sound
"Scars"	2021	— (Note: "Scars" (Korean version) did not enter the Gaon Digital Chart, but peaked at number 114 on the component Download Chart.)	—	—	2	2	—	—	—	7	—	RIAJ: Platinum (phy.)	The Sound
"Christmas EveL"	2021	114	—	—	—	— (Note: "Christmas EveL" did not enter the Billboard Japan Hot 100, but peaked at number 51 on the Download Songs.)	—	—	—	10	— (Note: "Christmas EveL" did not enter the Billboard Global 200, but peaked at number 197 on the Global Excl. US.)		Christmas EveL
"Winter Falls"	2021	151	—	—	—	—	—	—	—	—	—		Christmas EveL
"Maniac"	2022	29	79	79	28	21	4	98	— (Note: "Maniac" did not enter the Billboard Hot 100, but peaked at number 19 on the Bubbling Under Hot 100.)	1	21	RIAA: Gold; RIAJ: Platinum (st.); RMNZ: Gold	Oddinary
"Your Eyes"	2022	—	—	—	—	68	—	—	—	—	—		Circus
"Circus"	2022	— (Note: "Circus" (Korean version) did not enter the Circle Digital Chart, but peaked at number 34 on the component Download Chart.)	—	—	43	47	29	—	—	—	—		Circus
"Mixtape: Time Out"	2022	— (Note: "Mixtape: Time Out" did not enter the Gaon Digital Chart, but peaked at number 29 on the component Download Chart.)	—	—	— (Note: "Mixtape: Time Out" did not enter the Oricon Combined Singles Chart, but peaked at number 36 on the Digital Singles Chart.)	— (Note: "Mixtape: Time Out" did not enter the Billboard Japan Hot 100, but peaked at number 37 on the Download Songs.)	—	—	—	4	—		5-Star
"Case 143"	2022	20	—	—	20	14	10	— (Note: "Case 143" did not enter the UK Singles Chart, but peaked at number 74 on the Singles Sales Chart.)	—	1	59	RIAA: Gold; RIAJ: Platinum (st.)	Maxident
"The Sound"	2023	— (Note: "The Sound" (Korean version) did not enter the Circle Digital Chart, but peaked at number 26 on the component Download Chart.)	—	—	26	34	—	—	—	11	—		The Sound
"S-Class"	2023	34	67	96	10	8	8	100	— (Note: "S-Class" did not enter the Billboard Hot 100, but peaked at number 19 on the Bubbling Under Hot 100.)	2	24	RIAA: Gold; RIAJ: Platinum (st.)	5-Star
"Super Bowl" (Note: "Super Bowl" was originally released in June 2023 as a track from Stray Kids' third studio album 5-Star. Then, it was re-recorded in Japanese and released as a single in Japan in August 2023.)	2023	— (Note: "Super Bowl" did not enter the Circle Digital Chart, but peaked at number 21 on the component Download Chart.)	—	—	— (Note: "Super Bowl" (Japanese version) did not enter the Oricon Combined Singles Chart, but peaked at number 42 on the Digital Singles Chart, and number 43 on the Streaming Chart.)	56	24	—	—	13	—		Social Path / Super Bowl (Japanese Ver.)
"Social Path" (featuring Lisa)	2023	— (Note: "Social Path" (Korean version) did not enter the Circle Digital Chart, but peaked at number 18 on the component Download Chart.)	—	—	27	27	29	—	—	—	—		Social Path / Super Bowl (Japanese Ver.)
"Lalalala"	2023	6	64	65	8	9	8	44	90	1	10	RIAA: Gold; RIAJ: Gold (st.)	Rock-Star
"Lose My Breath" (featuring Charlie Puth)	2024	— (Note: "Lose My Breath" did not enter the Circle Digital Chart, but peaked at number 52 on the component Download Chart and number 78 on the component BGM Chart.)	— (Note: "Lose My Breath" did not enter the ARIA Singles Chart, but peaked at number 44 on the Digital Track Chart and number seven on the Hitseekers Chart.)	— (Note: "Lose My Breath" did not enter the Canadian Hot 100, but peaked at number 42 on the Canadian Digital Song Sales.)	23	27	13	97	90	—	35		Non-album single
"Chk Chk Boom"	2024	23	85	55	11	12	1	30	49	1	10	BPI: Silver; RIAA: Gold; RIAJ: Gold (st.); SNEP: Gold	Ate
"Night"	2024	— (Note: "Night" did not enter the Circle Digital Chart, but peaked at number 69 on the component Download Chart and number 179 on the component BGM Chart.)	—	—	48	93	—	— (Note: "Night" did not enter the UK Singles Chart, but peaked at number 52 on the Singles Sales Chart.)	—	—	—		Giant
"Falling Up"	2024	— (Note: "Falling Up" did not enter the Circle Digital Chart, but peaked at number 154 on the component Download Chart.)	—	—	— (Note: "Falling Up" did not enter the Oricon Combined Singles Chart, but peaked at number 13 on the Digital Singles Chart.)	— (Note: "Falling Up" did not enter the Billboard Japan Hot 100, but peaked at number 9 on the Download Songs, and number 69 on the Streaming Songs.)	—	— (Note: "Falling Up" did not enter the UK Singles Chart, but peaked at number 96 on the Singles Downloads Chart.)	—	2	—		Giant
"Come Play" (with Young Miko and Tom Morello)	2024	— (Note: "Come Play" did not enter the Circle Digital Chart, but peaked at number 159 on the component Download Chart.)	—	—	—	—	—	— (Note: "Come Play" did not enter the UK Singles Chart, but peaked at number 31 on the Physical Singles Chart.)	—	—	—		Arcane League of Legends: Season 2
"Giant"	2024	— (Note: "Giant" (Korean version) did not enter the Circle Digital Chart, but peaked at number 78 on the component Download Chart, and number 176 on the component BGM Chart.)	—	—	— (Note: "Giant" did not enter the Oricon Combined Singles Chart, but peaked at number 26 on the Digital Singles Chart.)	82	—	— (Note: "Giant" did not enter the UK Singles Chart, but peaked at number 53 on the Singles Sales Chart.)	—	2	—		Giant
"Walkin on Water"	2024	137	—	—	— (Note: "Walkin on Water" did not enter the Oricon Combined Singles Chart, but peaked at number 42 on the Digital Singles Chart.)	83	11	— (Note: "Walkin on Water" did not enter the UK Singles Chart, but peaked at number 5 on the Singles Sales Chart.)	— (Note: "Walkin on Water" did not enter the Billboard Hot 100, but peaked at number 8 on the Bubbling Under Hot 100.)	1	66		Hop
"Hollow"	2025	— (Note: "Hollow" did not enter the Circle Digital Chart, but peaked at number 192 on the component Download Chart.)	—	—	38	30	37	— (Note: "Walkin on Water" did not enter the UK Singles Chart, but peaked at number 30 on the Singles Sales Chart.)	—	7	—		Hollow
"Ceremony"	2025	17	—	64	19	28	10	37	52	1	10		Karma
"In the Dark" (with DJ Snake)	2025	—	—	—	—	—	26	— (Note: "In the Dark" did not enter the UK Singles Chart, but peaked at number 69 on the Singles Sales Chart.)	—	—	—		Nomad
"Do It"	2025	46	— (Note: "Do It" did not chart on its own in Australia, as per Australian chart rules, releases with five tracks or fewer chart on the singles chart. Thus, streaming and sales activity of the songs from Do It counted towards one placement.)	56	27	33	9	35	68	1	13		Do It
"Divine"	2025	— (Note: "Divine" did not enter the Circle Digital Chart, but peaked at number 9 on the component Download Chart, and number 120 on the component BGM Chart.)	—	—	—	— (Note: "Divine" did not enter the Billboard Japan Hot 100, but peaked at number five on the Hot Shot Songs.)	15	—	—	3	126		Do It
"Stay"	2026	— (Note: "Stay" did not enter the Circle Digital Chart, but peaked at number 34 on the component Download Chart, and number 52 on the component BGM Chart.)	—	—	— (Note: "Stay" did not enter the Oricon Combined Singles Chart, but peaked at number 16 on the Digital Singles Chart.)	— (Note: "Stay" did not enter the Billboard Japan Hot 100, but peaked at number 11 on the Hot Shot Songs, and number 17 on the Download Songs.)	—	—	—	4	—		SKZ-Replay 2026 Pt.1
"Run It"	2026	— (Note: "Run It" did not enter the Circle Digital Chart, but peaked at number 26 on the component Download Chart, and number 57 on the component BGM Chart.)	—	—	— (Note: "Run It" did not enter the Oricon Combined Singles Chart, but peaked at number 8 on the Digital Singles Chart, and number 42 on the Streaming Chart.)	26	15	— (Note: "Run It" did not enter the UK Singles Chart, but peaked at number 14 on the Singles Sales Chart.)	— (Note: "Run It" did not enter the Billboard Hot 100, but peaked at number 9 on the Digital Song Sales.)	*	— (Note: "Run It" did not enter the Billboard Global 200, but peaked at number 163 on the Global Excl. US.)		This & That
"This & That"	2026	35	76	77	— (Note: "This & That" did not enter the Oricon Combined Singles Chart, but peaked at number 47 on the Streaming Chart.)	51	3	61	38	*	25		This & That
"Suiatsu"	2026	—	—	—	47	34	28	—	—	*	—		Suiatsu
"—" denotes releases that did not chart or were not released in that region.

=== Promotional singles ===
List of promotional singles, showing year released, selected chart positions, and name of the album
Title	Year	Peak chart positions							Album
Title	Year	KOR	JPN Cmb.	JPN Hot	NZ Hot	UK Sales	US Dance Dig.	US World	Album
"Neverending Story"	2019	—	—	—	—	—	—	14	Extraordinary You OST
"Slump"	2020	—	—	—	—	—	—	17	Go Live and All In
"Hello Stranger"	2020	—	—	—	—	—	—	21	Pop Out Boy! OST Part 1
"There"	2023	—	38	54	—	—	—	—	The Sound
"Like Magic" (with J.Y. Park, Itzy and Nmixx)	2024	— (Note: "Like Magic" did not enter the Circle Digital Chart, but peaked at number 63 on the component Download Chart.)	—	—	—	—	—	—	Non-album promotional single
"Why?"	2024	—	26	25	39	—	—	2	Giant
"Slash"	2024	— (Note: "Slash" did not chart on the Circle Digital Chart, but peaked at position 24 and 151 on components Download and BGM Chart, respectively.)	— (Note: "Slash" did not enter the Oricon Singles Chart, but peaked at number 12 on the Digital Singles Chart.)	— (Note: "Slash" did not enter the Billboard Japan Hot 100, but peaked at number 13 on the Download Songs.)	—	75	—	5	Deadpool & Wolverine
"Endless Sun"	2026	— (Note: "Endless Sun" did not chart on the Circle Digital Chart, but peaked at position 93 and 86 on components Download and BGM Chart, respectively.)	— (Note: "Endless Sun" did not enter the Oricon Combined Singles Chart, but peaked at number 19 on the Digital Singles Chart.)	— (Note: "Endless Sun" did not enter the Billboard Japan Hot 100, but peaked at number 21 on the Download Songs.)	—	38	6	—	Non-album promotional single
"November 11th"	2026	—	— (Note: "November 11th" did not enter the Oricon Combined Singles Chart, but peaked at number 28 on the Digital Singles Chart.)	— (Note: "November 11th" did not enter the Billboard Japan Hot 100, but peaked at number 30 on the Download Songs.)	—	—	—	—	Non-album promotional single
"—" denotes releases that did not chart or were not released in that region.

== Other charted songs ==
List of other charted songs, showing year released, selected chart positions, and name of the album
Title	Year	Peak chart positions							Album
Title	Year	KOR	JPN Hot	NZ Hot	UK Sales	US Rap Dig.	US World	WW	Album
"The Tortoise and the Hare"	2020	—	—	—	—	—	20	—	In Life
"B Me"	2020	—	—	—	—	—	15	—	In Life
"Any"	2020	—	—	—	—	—	13	—	In Life
"Ex"	2020	— (Note: "Ex" did not enter the Gaon Digital Chart, but peaked at number 175 on the Download Chart.)	—	—	—	—	17	—	In Life
"We Go" (Bang Chan, Changbin, and Han)	2020	—	—	—	—	—	10	—	In Life
"Wow" (Lee Know, Hyunjin, and Felix)	2020	—	—	—	—	—	12	—	In Life
"My Universe" (Seungmin and I.N featuring Changbin)	2020	—	—	—	—	—	21	—	In Life
"Wolfgang"	2021	138	—	—	—	—	4	— (Note: "Wolfgang" did not enter the Billboard Global 200, but peaked at number 109 on the Global Excl. US.)	Kingdom <Final: Who Is the King?> and Noeasy
"Cheese"	2021	— (Note: "Cheese" did not enter the Gaon Digital Chart, but peaked at number 19 on the component Download Chart.)	—	—	—	—	14	—	Noeasy
"Domino"	2021	— (Note: "Domino" did not enter the Gaon Digital Chart, but peaked at number 17 on the component Download Chart while the English version peaked at number 181.)	—	—	—	—	11	—	Noeasy
"Ssick"	2021	— (Note: "Ssick" did not enter the Gaon Digital Chart, but peaked at number 27 on the component Download Chart.)	—	—	—	—	22	—	Noeasy
"The View"	2021	— (Note: "The View" did not enter the Gaon Digital Chart, but peaked at number 21 on the component Download Chart.)	—	—	—	—	18	—	Noeasy
"Sorry, I Love You"	2021	— (Note: "Sorry, I Love You" did not enter the Gaon Digital Chart, but peaked at number 22 on the component Download Chart.)	—	—	—	—	24	—	Noeasy
"Silent Cry"	2021	— (Note: "Silent Cry" did not enter the Gaon Digital Chart, but peaked at number 23 on the component Download Chart.)	—	—	—	—	—	—	Noeasy
"Secret Secret"	2021	— (Note: "Secret Secret" did not enter the Gaon Digital Chart, but peaked at number 24 on the component Download Chart.)	—	—	—	—	—	—	Noeasy
"Star Lost"	2021	— (Note: "Star Lost" did not enter the Gaon Digital Chart, but peaked at number 26 on the component Download Chart.)	—	—	—	—	—	—	Noeasy
"Red Lights" (Bang Chan and Hyunjin)	2021	— (Note: "Red Lights" did not enter the Gaon Digital Chart, but peaked at number 30 on the component Download Chart.)	—	—	—	—	13	—	Noeasy
"Surfin'" (Lee Know, Changbin, and Felix)	2021	— (Note: "Surfin'" did not enter the Gaon Digital Chart, but peaked at number 29 on the component Download Chart.)	—	—	—	—	—	—	Noeasy
"Gone Away" (Han, Seungmin, and I.N)	2021	— (Note: "Gone Away" did not enter the Gaon Digital Chart, but peaked at number 25 on the component Download Chart.)	—	—	—	—	—	—	Noeasy
"Call"	2021	—	93	—	—	—	—	—	Scars / Thunderous (Japanese ver.)
"24 to 25"	2021	— (Note: "24 to 25" did not enter the Gaon Digital Chart, but peaked at number 115 on the component Download Chart.)	—	—	—	—	—	—	Christmas EveL
"Venom"	2022	— (Note: "Venom" did not enter the Gaon Digital Chart, but peaked at number 16 on the component Download Chart.)	— (Note: "Venom" did not enter the Billboard Japan Hot 100, but peaked at number 73 on the Download Songs.)	26	—	—	7	— (Note: "Venom" did not enter the Billboard Global 200, but peaked at number 164 on the Global Excl. US.)	Oddinary
"Charmer"	2022	— (Note: "Charmer" did not enter the Gaon Digital Chart, but peaked at number 21 on the component Download Chart.)	— (Note: "Charmer" did not enter the Billboard Japan Hot 100, but peaked at number 100 on the Download Songs.)	31	—	—	10	—	Oddinary
"Freeze"	2022	— (Note: "Freeze" did not enter the Gaon Digital Chart, but peaked at number 22 on the component Download Chart.)	— (Note: "Freeze" did not enter the Billboard Japan Hot 100, but peaked at number 91 on the Download Songs.)	36	—	—	14	—	Oddinary
"Lonely St."	2022	— (Note: "Lonely St." did not enter the Gaon Digital Chart, but peaked at number 20 on the component Download Chart.)	— (Note: "Lonely St." did not enter the Billboard Japan Hot 100, but peaked at number 90 on the Download Songs.)	—	—	—	—	—	Oddinary
"Waiting for Us" (Bang Chan, Lee Know, Seungmin, and I.N)	2022	— (Note: "Waiting for Us" did not enter the Gaon Digital Chart, but peaked at number 25 on the component Download Chart.)	—	—	—	—	—	—	Oddinary
"Muddy Water" (Changbin, Hyunjin, Han, and Felix)	2022	— (Note: "Muddy Water" did not enter the Gaon Digital Chart, but peaked at number 26 on the component Download Chart.)	—	—	—	—	—	—	Oddinary
"Heyday" (Bang Chan, Changbin, and Han)	2022	— (Note: "Heyday" did not enter the Circle Digital Chart, but peaked at number 118 on the component Download Chart.)	—	—	—	—	13	—	Street Man Fighter Original Vol.4 Crew Songs
"Chill"	2022	— (Note: "Chill" did not enter the Circle Digital Chart, but peaked at number 26 on the component Download Chart.)	—	—	—	—	—	—	Maxident
"Give Me Your TMI"	2022	— (Note: "Give Me Your TMI" did not enter the Circle Digital Chart, but peaked at number 30 on the component Download Chart.)	—	—	—	—	—	—	Maxident
"Super Board"	2022	— (Note: "Super Board" did not enter the Circle Digital Chart, but peaked at number 33 on the component Download Chart.)	—	—	—	—	—	—	Maxident
"3Racha" (Bang Chan, Changbin, and Han)	2022	— (Note: "3Racha" did not enter the Circle Digital Chart, but peaked at number 36 on the component Download Chart.)	—	24	—	—	13	—	Maxident
"Taste" (Lee Know, Hyunjin, and Felix)	2022	— (Note: "Taste" did not enter the Circle Digital Chart, but peaked at number 32 on the component Download Chart.)	—	23	—	—	9	—	Maxident
"Can't Stop" (Seungmin and I.N)	2022	— (Note: "Can't Stop" did not enter the Circle Digital Chart, but peaked at number 31 on the component Download Chart.)	—	—	—	—	—	—	Maxident
"Fam" (Korean version)	2022	— (Note: "Fam" (Korean version) did not enter the Circle Digital Chart, but peaked at number 24 on the component Download Chart.)	—	—	—	—	—	—	SKZ-Replay
"Limbo" (Lee Know)	2022	— (Note: "Limbo" did not enter the Circle Digital Chart, but peaked at number 150 on the component Download Chart.)	—	—	—	—	—	—	SKZ-Replay
"Love Untold" (Hyunjin)	2022	— (Note: "Love Untold" did not enter the Circle Digital Chart, but peaked at number 189 on the component Download Chart.)	—	—	—	—	—	—	SKZ-Replay
"Deep End" (Felix)	2022	— (Note: "Deep End" did not enter the Circle Digital Chart, but peaked at number 178 on the component Download Chart.)	—	—	—	—	—	—	SKZ-Replay
"Stars and Raindrops" (Seungmin)	2022	— (Note: "Stars and Raindrops" did not enter the Circle Digital Chart, but peaked at number 195 on the component Download Chart.)	—	—	—	—	—	—	SKZ-Replay
"Hall of Fame"	2023	— (Note: "Hall of Fame" did not enter the Circle Digital Chart, but peaked at number 15 on the component Download Chart.)	—	—	—	—	11	—	5-Star
"Item"	2023	— (Note: "Item" did not enter the Circle Digital Chart, but peaked at number 20 on the component Download Chart.)	—	26	—	—	15	—	5-Star
"Topline" (featuring Tiger JK)	2023	— (Note: "Topline" did not enter the Circle Digital Chart, but peaked at number 16 on the component Download Chart.)	—	19	—	—	8	— (Note: "Topline" did not enter the Billboard Global 200, but peaked at number 186 on the Global Excl. US.)	5-Star
"DLC"	2023	— (Note: "DLC" did not enter the Circle Digital Chart, but peaked at number 17 on the component Download Chart.)	—	—	—	—	—	—	5-Star
"Get Lit"	2023	— (Note: "Get Lit" did not enter the Circle Digital Chart, but peaked at number 18 on the component Download Chart.)	—	—	—	—	—	—	5-Star
"Collision"	2023	— (Note: "Collision" did not enter the Circle Digital Chart, but peaked at number 19 on the component Download Chart.)	—	—	—	—	—	—	5-Star
"FNF"	2023	— (Note: "FNF" did not enter the Circle Digital Chart, but peaked at number 22 on the component Download Chart.)	—	—	—	—	—	—	5-Star
"Youtiful"	2023	— (Note: "Youtiful" did not enter the Circle Digital Chart, but peaked at number 23 on the component Download Chart.)	—	—	—	—	—	—	5-Star
"Butterflies"	2023	—	— (Note: "Butterflies" did not enter the Billboard Japan Hot 100, but peaked at number 71 on the Download Songs.)	—	—	—	14	—	Social Path / Super Bowl (Japanese Ver.)
"Megaverse"	2023	— (Note: "Megaverse" did not enter the Circle Digital Chart, but peaked at number 13 on the component Download Chart.)	— (Note: "Megaverse" did not enter the Billboard Japan Hot 100, but peaked at number 70 on the Download Songs, and number 90 on the Streaming Songs.)	18	—	—	6	106	Rock-Star
"Blind Spot"	2023	— (Note: "Blind Spot" did not enter the Circle Digital Chart, but peaked at number 16 on the component Download Chart.)	—	38	—	—	—	— (Note: "Blind Spot" did not enter the Billboard Global 200, but peaked at number 168 on the Global Excl. US.)	Rock-Star
"Comflex"	2023	— (Note: "Comflex" did not enter the Circle Digital Chart, but peaked at number 19 on the component Download Chart.)	—	—	—	—	—	— (Note: "Comflex" did not enter the Billboard Global 200, but peaked at number 190 on the Global Excl. US.)	Rock-Star
"Cover Me"	2023	— (Note: "Cover Me" did not enter the Circle Digital Chart, but peaked at number 17 on the component Download Chart.)	—	30	—	—	—	— (Note: "Cover Me" did not enter the Billboard Global 200, but peaked at number 175 on the Global Excl. US.)	Rock-Star
"Leave"	2023	— (Note: "Leave" did not enter the Circle Digital Chart, but peaked at number 15 on the component Download Chart.)	—	—	—	—	—	— (Note: "Leave" did not enter the Billboard Global 200, but peaked at number 196 on the Global Excl. US.)	Rock-Star
"Mountains"	2024	— (Note: "Mountains" did not enter the Circle Digital Chart, but peaked at number 16 on the component Download Chart.)	— (Note: "Mountains" did not enter the Billboard Japan Hot 100, but peaked at number 91 on the Download Songs.)	19	—	—	7	— (Note: "Mountains" did not enter the Billboard Global 200, but peaked at number 160 on the Global Excl. US.)	Ate
"Jjam"	2024	— (Note: "Jjam" did not enter the Circle Digital Chart, but peaked at number 19 on the component Download Chart.)	—	23	—	—	9	—	Ate
"I Like It"	2024	— (Note: "I Like It" did not enter the Circle Digital Chart, but peaked at number 18 on the component Download Chart.)	—	8	—	—	—	— (Note: "I Like It" did not enter the Billboard Global 200, but peaked at number 180 on the Global Excl. US.)	Ate
"Runners"	2024	— (Note: "Runners" did not enter the Circle Digital Chart, but peaked at number 21 on the component Download Chart.)	—	—	—	—	—	—	Ate
"Twilight"	2024	— (Note: "Twilight" did not enter the Circle Digital Chart, but peaked at number 20 on the component Download Chart.)	—	—	—	—	10	—	Ate
"Stray Kids"	2024	— (Note: "Stray Kids" did not enter the Circle Digital Chart, but peaked at number 17 on the component Download Chart.)	—	—	—	—	—	—	Ate
"Christmas Love"	2024	—	— (Note: "Christmas Love" did not enter the Billboard Japan Hot 100, but peaked at number 100 on the Download Songs.)	—	—	—	—	—	Giant
"Bounce Back"	2024	— (Note: "Bounce Back" did not enter the Circle Digital Chart, but peaked at number 32 on the component Download Chart.)	—	—	—	—	7	—	Hop
"U" (featuring Tablo)	2024	— (Note: "U" did not enter the Circle Digital Chart, but peaked at number 24 on the component Download Chart.)	—	28	—	—	5	—	Hop
"Railway" (Bang Chan)	2024	— (Note: "Railway" did not enter the Circle Digital Chart, but peaked at number 33 on the component Download Chart.)	—	15	—	—	—	—	Hop
"Unfair"" (Felix)	2024	— (Note: "Unfair" did not enter the Circle Digital Chart, but peaked at number 20 on the component Download Chart.)	—	18	—	—	—	—	Hop
"Hallucination" (I.N)	2024	— (Note: "Hallucination" did not enter the Circle Digital Chart, but peaked at number 30 on the component Download Chart.)	—	—	—	—	6	—	Hop
"Youth" (Lee Know)	2024	— (Note: "Youth" did not enter the Circle Digital Chart, but peaked at number 25 on the component Download Chart.)	—	—	—	—	—	—	Hop
"So Good" (Hyunjin)	2024	— (Note: "So Good" did not enter the Circle Digital Chart, but peaked at number 24 on the component Download Chart.)	—	—	—	—	8	—	Hop
"Ultra" (Changbin)	2024	— (Note: "Ultra" did not enter the Circle Digital Chart, but peaked at number 31 on the component Download Chart.)	—	—	—	—	—	—	Hop
"Hold My Hand" (Han)	2024	— (Note: "Hold My Hand" did not enter the Circle Digital Chart, but peaked at number 28 on the component Download Chart.)	—	—	—	—	9	—	Hop
"As We Are" (Seungmin)	2024	— (Note: "As We Are" did not enter the Circle Digital Chart, but peaked at number 29 on the component Download Chart.)	—	—	—	—	—	—	Hop
"Burnin' Tires" (Changbin, I.N)	2025	— (Note: "Burnin' Tires" did not enter the Circle Digital Chart, but peaked at number 160 on the component Download Chart.)	—	36	41	—	3	—	Mixtape: Dominate
"Truman" (Han, Felix)	2025	— (Note: "Truman" did not enter the Circle Digital Chart, but peaked at number 140 on the component Download Chart.)	— (Note: "Truman" did not enter the Billboard Japan Hot 100, but peaked at number 86 on the Download Songs.)	22	33	7	—	—	Mixtape: Dominate
"Escape" (Bang Chan and Hyunjin)	2025	— (Note: "Escape" did not enter the Circle Digital Chart, but peaked at number 148 on the component Download Chart.)	— (Note: "Escape" did not enter the Billboard Japan Hot 100, but peaked at number 100 on the Download Songs.)	24	35	—	1	—	Mixtape: Dominate
"Cinema" (Lee Know, Seungmin)	2025	— (Note: "Cinema" did not enter the Circle Digital Chart, but peaked at number 141 on the component Download Chart.)	— (Note: "Escape" did not enter the Billboard Japan Hot 100, but peaked at number 52 on the Download Songs.)	31	47	—	2	—	Mixtape: Dominate
"Just a Little"	2025	—	— (Note: "Just a Little" did not enter the Billboard Japan Hot 100, but peaked at number 15 on the Hot Shot Songs.)	—	—	—	—	—	Hollow
"Fate"	2025	—	— (Note: "Fate" did not enter the Billboard Japan Hot 100, but peaked at number 17 on the Hot Shot Songs.)	—	—	—	—	—	Hollow
"Bleep"	2025	— (Note: "Bleep" did not enter the Circle Digital Chart, but peaked at number 16 on the component Download Chart, and number 180 on the component BGM Chart.)	—	30	—	—	7	— (Note: "Bleep" did not enter the Billboard Global 200, but peaked at number 186 on the Global Excl. US.)	Karma
"Creed"	2025	— (Note: "Creed" did not enter the Circle Digital Chart, but peaked at number 22 on the component Download Chart.)	—	36	—	—	6	—	Karma
"Mess"	2025	— (Note: "Mess" did not enter the Circle Digital Chart, but peaked at number 18 on the component Download Chart, and number 110 on the component BGM Chart.)	—	—	—	—	—	—	Karma
"In My Head"	2025	— (Note: "In My Head" did not enter the Circle Digital Chart, but peaked at number 19 on the component Download Chart, and number 152 on the component BGM Chart.)	—	—	—	—	9	—	Karma
"Half Time"	2025	— (Note: "Half Time" did not enter the Circle Digital Chart, but peaked at number 17 on the component Download Chart, and number 155 on the component BGM Chart.)	—	—	—	—	—	—	Karma
"Phoenix"	2025	— (Note: "Phoenix" did not enter the Circle Digital Chart, but peaked at number 23 on the component Download Chart, and number 196 on the component BGM Chart.)	—	—	—	—	8	—	Karma
"Ghost"	2025	— (Note: "Ghost" did not enter the Circle Digital Chart, but peaked at number 26 on the component Download Chart.)	—	—	—	—	—	—	Karma
"0801"	2025	— (Note: "0801" did not enter the Circle Digital Chart, but peaked at number 24 on the component Download Chart.)	—	—	—	—	10	—	Karma
"Holiday"	2025	— (Note: "Holiday" did not enter the Circle Digital Chart, but peaked at number 23 on the component Download Chart.)	—	23	—	—	—	—	Do It
"Photobook"	2025	— (Note: "Photobook" did not enter the Circle Digital Chart, but peaked at number 22 on the component Download Chart, and number 131 on the component BGM Chart.)	—	30	—	—	7	—	Do It
"Battle Ground" (Korean version)	2026	— (Note: "Battle Ground" (Korean version) did not enter the Circle Digital Chart, but peaked at number 82 on the component Download Chart.)	—	—	—	*	*	—	SKZ-Replay 2026 Pt.1
"Lover" (Hyunjin)	2026	— (Note: "Lover" did not enter the Circle Digital Chart, but peaked at number 27 on the component Download Chart.)	—	—	—	*	*	—	SKZ-Replay 2026 Pt.1
"Rev It Up" (Felix)	2026	— (Note: "Lover" did not enter the Circle Digital Chart, but peaked at number 109 on the component Download Chart.)	—	—	—	*	*	—	SKZ-Replay 2026 Pt.1
"After You"	2026	— (Note: "After You" did not enter the Circle Digital Chart, but peaked at number 20 on the component Download Chart.)	—	9	—	*	*	—	This & That
"Farming"	2026	— (Note: "Farming" did not enter the Circle Digital Chart, but peaked at number 22 on the component Download Chart.)	—	10	—	*	*	—	This & That
"I Do"	2026	— (Note: "I Do" did not enter the Circle Digital Chart, but peaked at number 23 on the component Download Chart.)	—	15	—	*	*	—	This & That
"Way Out"	2026	— (Note: "Way Out" did not enter the Circle Digital Chart, but peaked at number 24 on the component Download Chart.)	—	—	—	*	*	—	This & That
"Back Then"	2026	— (Note: "Back Then" did not enter the Circle Digital Chart, but peaked at number 21 on the component Download Chart.)	—	—	—	*	*	—	This & That
"—" denotes releases that did not chart or were not released in that region.

== Guest appearances ==
List of non-single guest appearances
Title	Year	Other artist(s)	Album
"All My Life" (Stray Kids remix)	2023	Lil Durk	All My Life (remix)

== Videography ==
=== Video albums ===
List of video albums, showing selected details, selected chart positions, and sales figures
Title	Details	Peaks	Sales
Title	Details	JPN BD	Sales
Stray Kids World Tour "District 9: Unlock" in Seoul	Released: January 27, 2021; Label: JYP; Format: DVD, BD	—	
Stray Kids 2nd World Tour "Maniac" in Seoul	Released: August 8, 2023 (DVD); August 31, 2023 (BD); Label: JYP; Format: DVD, BD	—	
Stray Kids 2nd World Tour "Maniac" Encore in Japan	Released: February 7, 2024; Label: Epic Japan; Format: BD	1	JPN: 84,480
Stray Kids 5-Star Dome Tour 2023	Released: September 18, 2024; Label: Epic Japan; Format: BD	1	JPN: 70,040
Stray Kids World Tour "Dominate Seoul"	Release: December 2, 2025; Label: JYP; Format: DVD, BD	—	
Stray Kids Fan Connecting 2024 "SKZ Toy World"	Released: December 24, 2025; Label: Epic Japan; Format: BD	2	JPN: 39,620
Stray Kids World Tour <Dominate Japan>	Released: July 1, 2026; Label: Epic Japan; Format: BD	2	JPN: 48,783
"—" denotes releases that did not chart or were not released in that region.

=== Music videos ===
List of music videos
Title	Year	Director(s)	Ref.
"Hellevator"	2017	OJun Kwon (AR Film)	
"District 9"	2018	Yong-soo Kim (Highqualityfish)	
"Grow Up"	2018	Jimmy (BS Pictures)	
"My Pace"	2018	Yong-soo Kim (Highqualityfish)	
"Awkward Silence"	2018	Jimmy (VIA)	
"Mixtape#2"	2018	Unknown	
"I Am You"	2018	Yong-soo Kim (Highqualityfish)	
"Mixtape#3"	2018	Jimmy (VIA)	
"Get Cool"	2018	Jimmy (VIA)	
"Miroh"	2019	Dirextor Kim (Highqualityfish)	
"19"	2019	Kinotaku	
"Chronosaurus"	2019	Kinotaku	
"Side Effects"	2019	Dirextor Kim (Highqualityfish)	
"TMT"	2019	Jimmy (VIA)	
"Double Knot"	2019	Jimmy (VIA)	
"Astronaut"	2019	Pinklabel Visual	
"Levanter"	2019	Ziyong Kim (FantazyLab)	
"You Can Stay"	2019	Novvkim	
"Mixtape: Gone Days"	2019	Kinotaku	
"Levanter" (Japanese version)	2020	Ziyong Kim (FantazyLab)	
"Mixtape: On Track"	2020	Lee Sang-duk	
"Slump" (Japanese version)	2020	Unknown	
"Top" (Japanese version)	2020	Oui Kim (OUI)	
"God's Menu"	2020	Bang Jae-yeob	
"Blueprint"	2020	Jimmy (VIA)	
"Easy"	2020	Novvkim	
"Back Door"	2020	Bang Jae-yeob	
"Ex"	2020	Novvkim	
"Any"	2020	Unknown	
"God's Menu" (Japanese version)	2020	Bang Jae-yeob	
"All In"	2020	Bang Jae-yeob	
"Fam"	2020	Novvkim	
"Mixtape: Oh"	2021	Jimmy	
"Thunderous"	2021	Bang Jae-yeob	
"The View"	2021	Jimmy (VIA)	
"Sorry, I Love You"	2021	Jeong Woo-ram	
"Cheese"	2021	Jeong Nu-ri (Cosmo), Jan' Qui	
"Red Lights" (Bang Chan and Hyunjin)	2021	Novvkim	
"Surfin'" (Lee Know, Changbin, and Felix)	2021	Novvkim	
"Gone Away" (Han, Seungmin, and I.N)	2021	Novvkim	
"Secret Secret"	2021	Jeong Woo-ram	
"Scars"	2021	Bang Jae-yeob	
"Christmas EveL"	2021	Lee Hye-sung (Sushivisual)	
"Winter Falls"	2021	Novvkim	
"24 to 25"	2021	Jimmy	
"Call"	2021	Unknown	
"#LoveStay"	2021	Unknown	
"Maniac"	2022	Bang Jae-yeob	
"Venom"	2022	Kim In-tae (AFF)	
"Lonely St."	2022	Novvkim	
"Freeze"	2022	Paxq	
"Your Eyes"	2022	Novvkim	
"Circus"	2022	Bang Jae-yeob	
"Mixtape: Time Out"	2022	Jimmy (VIA)	
"Case 143"	2022	725 (SL8 Visual Lab)	
"Super Board"	2022	Kim In-tae (AFF)	
"Chill"	2022	Wasabimayo	
"Give Me Your TMI"	2022	VShop (Vikings League)	
"Fam" (Korean version)	2022	Hamjae (88GH)	
"Fairytale"	2022	Unknown	
"Case 143" (Japanese version)	2023	Kawaisouni	
"The Sound"	2023	Bang Jae-yeob	
"S-Class"	2023	Bang Jae-yeob	
"DLC"	2023	Novvkim	
"FNF"	2023	Soobin Park (SOOB)	
"Get Lit"	2023	Lee Hyesu, Hong Jaehwan	
"Topline"	2023	OJun Kwon (AR Film)	
"S-Class" (SKZoo version)	2023	Unknown	
"Youtiful"	2023	Taiho Roh	
"Super Bowl" (Japanese version)	2023	Jeong Nu-ri (Cosmo)	
"Social Path"	2023	Novvkim	
"Lalalala"	2023	Bang Jae-yeob	
"Megaverse"	2023	OJun Kwon (AR Film)	
"Novel"	2023	Unknown	
"Like Magic" (with J.Y. Park, Itzy and Nmixx)	2024	Jan'Qui	
"Lose My Breath" (featuring Charlie Puth)	2024	Soze	
"Chk Chk Boom"	2024	Bang Jae-yeob	
"Mountains"	2024	Kim In-tae (AFF)	
"Stray Kids"	2024	Novvkim	
"Jjam"	2024	Jihoon Shin	
"Giant"	2024	Novvkim	
"Christmas Love"	2024	Sunny Visual	
"Walkin on Water"	2024	OJun Kwon (AR Film)	
"Burnin' Tires" (Changbin, I.N)	2025	NanyKim (NÄN)	
"Truman" (Han, Felix)	2025	Bang Jae-yeob	
"Escape" (Bang Chan and Hyunjin)	2025	Novvkim	
"Cinema" (Lee Know, Seungmin)	2025	Soobin Park (SOOB)	
"Hollow"	2025	Novvkim	
"Ceremony"	2025	Seong Won-mo (Digipedi)	
"Bleep"	2025	Juli YL	
"Creed"	2025	Yeom Woo-jin	
"Do It"	2025	Jihoon Shin	
"Do It" (Overdrive version)	2025	Jeong Nu-ri	
"Divine"	2025	Sam Son	
"Run It"	2026	Sam Son	
"This & That"	2026	Bang Jae-yeob	
"Back Then" (Song By version)	2026	Unknown	
"After You"	2026	Unknown	
"Farming"	2026	Unknown	

=== Other videos ===
List of other videos
Title	Year	Director(s)	Ref.
SKZ-Player
"Zone" (Bang Chan, Changbin, and Han)	2018	Unknown	
"Close" (Han)	2020	Novvkim	
"Streetlight" (Changbin featuring Bang Chan)	2020	Novvkim	
"Miss You" (Hyunjin)	2020	Novvkim	
"Maknae on Top"" (I.N featuring Bang Chan, Changbin)	2021	Novvkim	
"Up All Night" (Bang Chan, Changbin, Felix, Seungmin)	2021	Novvkim	
"Drive" (Bang Chan, Lee KNow)	2021	Novvkim	
"Party's Not Over"	2023	Novvkim	
"Hallucination" (I.N)	2024	Yeom Woo-jin	
"As We Are" (Seungmin)	2024	Soze	
"Unfair" (Felix)	2024	Soze	
"Hold My Hand" (Han)	2024	Soobin Park (SOOB)	
"So Good" (Hyunjin)	2024	Lee Hye-su, Hong Jae-hwan	
"Ultra" (Changbin)	2024	Woonghui (WWHH)	
"Youth" (Lee Know)	2024	Nany Kim	
"Railway" (Bang Chan)	2024	Novvkim	
"Back to Life" (Han)	2026	Unknown	
Performance video
"Beware"	2018	Jimmy (BS Pictures)	
"Spread My Wings"	2018	Jimmy (BS Pictures)	
"Mirror"	2018	Jimmy (BS Pictures)	
"My Pace" (performance video)	2018	Yong-soo Kim (Highqualityfish)	
"Voices"	2018	Jimmy	
"M.I.A."	2018	Jimmy	
"I Am You" (performance video)	2018	Yong-soo Kim (Highqualityfish)	
"Victory Song"	2019	Jimmy	
"Side Effects" (performance video)	2019	Jimmy	
"Double Knot" (English version)	2020	Novvkim	
"Thunderous" (Japanese version)	2021	Novvkim	
"Case 143" (performance video)	2022	Jimmy	
"Chk Chk Boom" (performance video)	2024	Jimmy	
Street version video
"Rock"	2018	Unknown	
"Insomnia"	2018	Unknown	
"Question"	2018	Unknown	
"My Side"	2018	Unknown	
"N/S"	2018	Unknown	
"Boxer"	2019	Unknown	
"Mixtape#4"	2019	Unknown	
"0801"	2025	Unknown	
Special video
"Haven"	2020	Unknown	
"Placebo"	2021	Unknown	
"There"	2023	Unknown	
Other video
"Lover" (Hyunjin)	2026	Unknown	
Lyric video
"Double Knot" (Japanese version)	2020	Unknown	
"Going Dumb" (with Alesso and Corsak)	2021	Unknown	
Lyric visualizer
"Lose My Breath" (Stray Kids version)	2024	Unknown	
"Ceremony" (Karma version)	2025	Unknown	
"Do It" (Turbo version)	2025	Unknown	

== See also ==
- List of songs recorded by Stray Kids
