= List of songs written by Changbin =

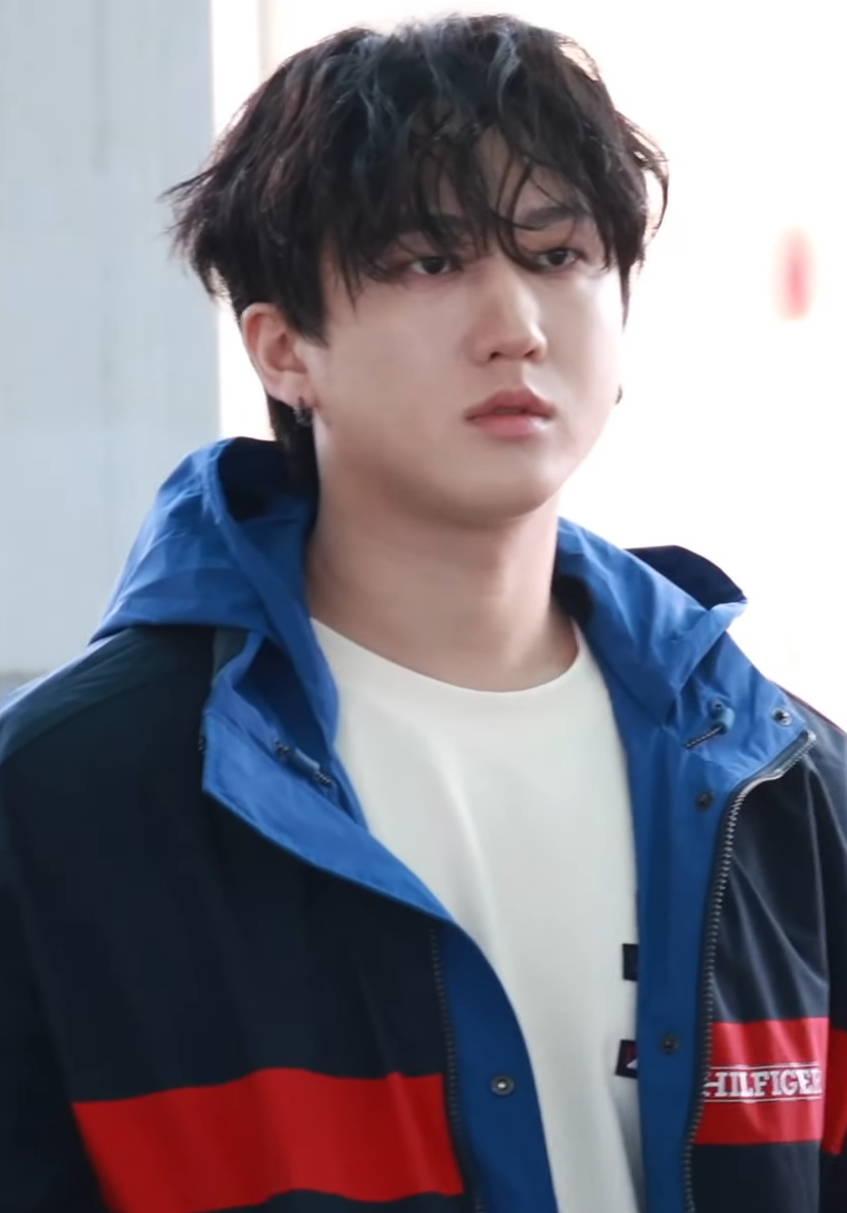
Changbin in May 2024

South Korean rapper, singer, songwriter, and music producer Seo Chang-bin, known mononymously as Changbin, is a member of the South Korean boy band Stray Kids, which debuted under JYP Entertainment in 2018. Changbin is also a core member of 3Racha, an in-house production team and sub-unit of Stray Kids, alongside fellow members Bang Chan and Han.

Changbin, as a member of 3Racha has co-written numerous songs for Stray Kids. Beyond Stray Kids, he co-wrote "Neverending Story" for the South Korean television series Extraordinary You and collaborated with Yoon Ji-sung on the song "You...Like the Wind", which he co-wrote and featured in for the EP Aside. Changbin also co-wrote and featured in "Mirror Mirror" with Thai rappers F. Hero and Milli, winning his first international awards for Best Collaboration at Thailand's Toty Music Awards and The Guitar Mag Awards. In 2024, he collaborated with Itzy and wrote the song "VAY" for the EP Gold. In the same year, he participated in writing and featured on the track "8th Grader (Respect Your Dreams)" for the singer and actor Kim Chang-wan.

As of April 2025, Changbin has registered songwriting credits for 181 songs with the Korea Music Copyright Association (KOMCA), including tracks like "Paradise" by NiziU, the theme song for Doraemon: Nobita's Sky Utopia, works for artists such as Show Lo, Yao Chen, and JO1, as well as collaborations with musicians like Japanese singer Lisa, Lil Durk, Sky-Hi, and Tiger JK. As a songwriter he won the Best Creator Award at the 2023 Asia Artist Awards along with bandmates Bang Chan and Han.

== Songs ==
Key
†	Indicates single
#	Indicates a non-commercial release
‡	Indicates songs written solely by Changbin
⁂	Song available in Korean and Japanese

All song credits are sourced from the KOMCA database, unless stated otherwise.

Song title, original artist, album of release, and year of release
Song	Artist(s)	Lyricist(s)	Composer(s)	Album	Year	Ref.
"0325"	Stray Kids	Bang Chan, Changbin, Han	Bang Chan; Changbin; Han; Hong Ji-sang	I Am You	2018	
"3Racha"	3Racha	Bang Chan, Changbin, Han	Bang Chan; Changbin; Han	Maxident	2022	
"3rd Eye"	Stray Kids	Bang Chan, Changbin, Han	Bang Chan; Changbin; Han; This N That	I Am Not	2018	
"4419"	Stray Kids	Bang Chan, Changbin, Han, Hyunjin, Seungmin	Bang Chan; Changbin; Han; RealBros (Ohwon Lee)	Mixtape	2018	
"8th Grader (Respect Your Dreams)" (중2 (모두의 우주를 Respect))	Kim Chang-wan, Changbin	Kim Chang-wan, Changbin	Kim Chang-wan	Non-album single	2024	
"Ai o Kureta no ni, Naze" (愛をくれたのに、なぜ Love is Painful)	Stray Kids	Bang Chan, Changbin, KM Markit	Changbin; Bang Chan; Kim Ju-hyeong	Giant	2024	
"Airplane" (비행기)	Stray Kids	Kang Dong Ha, Bang Chan, Changbin, Han, Kwon Tae-yang ($un), Young Chance	MosPick $un Young Chance; Bang Chan; Changbin	Go Live	2020	
"All In" †	Stray Kids	Bang Chan, Changbin, Han, J.Y. Park "The Asiansoul", KM-Markit	J.Y. Park "The Asiansoul"; Bang Chan; Changbin; Han; Young Chance	All In (EP)	2020	
"All In" (Korean version)	Stray Kids	Bang Chan, Changbin, Han, J.Y. Park "The Asiansoul"	J.Y. Park "The Asiansoul"; Bang Chan; Changbin; Han	Non-album single	2020	
"All My Life" (Stray Kids remix)	Lil Durk featuring Stray Kids	Durk Banks; Jermaine Cole; Łukasz Gottwald; Rocco Valdes; Ryan Ogren; Gamal Lewis; Theron Thomas; Bang Chan; Changbin; Han		Almost Healed	2023	
"Anthem" #	Stray Kids	Bang Chan, Changbin, Han	Bang Chan; Changbin; Han	Non-album single (Note: Pilot : For 5-Star)	2023	
"Any" (아니)	Stray Kids	Bang Chan, Changbin, Han	Bang Chan; Changbin; Han; Matluck; Tele	In Life	2020	
"Astronaut"	Stray Kids	Bang Chan, Changbin, Han	Bang Chan; Changbin; Han; Lorenzo Cosi; YK Koi	Clé: Levanter	2019	
"Awaken"	Stray Kids	Bang Chan, Changbin, Han	Bang Chan; Changbin; Han; Kim Park Chella	I Am Not	2018	
"Awkward Silence" (갑자기 분위기 싸해질 필요 없잖아요)	Stray Kids	Bang Chan, Changbin, Han	Bang Chan; Changbin; Han; Time	I Am Who	2018	
"B Me"	Stray Kids	Bang Chan, Changbin, Han, Earattack	Bang Chan; Changbin; Han; Earattack	In Life	2020	
"Back Door" † ⁂	Stray Kids	Bang Chan, Changbin, Han	Bang Chan; Changbin; Han; HotSauce	In Life; All In	2020	
"Back Door" (Loud version) #	Team JYP	Bang Chan, Changbin, Han	Bang Chan; Changbin; Han; HotSauce	Non-album single (Note: Loud Live Round -Final Debut-)	2021	
"Battle Ground"	Stray Kids	Bang Chan, Changbin, Han, KM Markit	Bang Chan; Changbin; Han; Frants	The Sound	2023	
"Battle Ground" (Korean version)	Stray Kids	Bang Chan, Changbin, Han	Bang Chan; Changbin; Han; Frants	Non-album single (Note: 5-Star Dome Tour 2023 Seoul Special (Unveil 13))	2023	
"Because" (좋으니까) #	Changbin, Felix	Changbin, Felix	Changbin; Bang Chan	SKZ-Replay	2021	
"Behind the Light" (그림자도 빛이 있어야 존재)	Stray Kids	Bang Chan, Changbin, Han, Hyunjin, Lee Know, Seungmin, I.N, Felix	Bang Chan; Lee Know; Changbin; Hyunjin; Han; Felix; Seungmin; I.N	SKZ2021	2021	
"Blind Spot" (사각지대)	Stray Kids	Bang Chan, Changbin, Han	Bang Chan; Changbin; Han; Willie Weeks	Rock-Star	2023	
"Blueprint" (청사진)	Stray Kids	Lee Su-Ran, Bang Chan, Changbin, Han	Earattack; Eniac	Go Live	2020	
"Booster"	Stray Kids	Bang Chan, Changbin, Han	Christian Fast; Henrik Nordenback; Albin Nordqvist	Clé: Levanter	2019	
"Boxer"	Stray Kids	Bang Chan, Changbin, Han	Bang Chan; Changbin; Han; Glory Face (Full8loom); Jake K (Full8loom)	Clé 1: Miroh	2019	
"Broken Compass"	Stray Kids	Bang Chan, Changbin, Han, Hyunjin, Lee Know, Seungmin, I.N, Felix	Bang Chan; Changbin; Han; Hyunjin; Lee Know; Seungmin; I.N; Felix	SKZ2021	2021	
"Case 143" † ⁂	Stary Kids	Bang Chan, Changbin, Han	Bang Chan; Changbin; Han; Raphael (Producing Lab); Daviid (3Scape); Yosia (3Scape)	Maxident; The Sound (Note: The Japanese ver. was included in this album in 2023)	2022	
"Charmer"	Stray Kids	Bang Chan, Changbin, Han	Bang Chan; Changbin; Han; Versachoi	Oddinary	2022	
"Cheese"	Stray Kids	Bang Chan, Changbin, Han	Bang Chan; Changbin; Han; Versachoi	Noeasy	2021	
"Chk Chk Boom" † ⁂	Stray Kids	Bang Chan, Changbin, Han	Bang Chan; Changbin; Han; Dallas Koehlke; Ronnie Icon; BB Elliot	Ate; Giant	2024	
"Christmas EveL" †	Stray Kids	Bang Chan, Changbin, Han	Bang Chan; Changbin; Han; HotSauce	Christmas EveL	2021	
"Chronosaurus"	Stray Kids	Bang Chan, Changbin, Han	Bang Chan; Changbin; Han; Kairos; SamUIL	Clé 1: Miroh	2019	
"Circus" †	Stray Kids	Bang Chan, Changbin, Han, KM Markit	Bang Chan; Changbin; Han; Earattack; Chan's (Take a Chance)	Circus	2022	
"Circus" (Korean version)	Stray Kids	Bang Chan, Changbin, Han	Bang Chan; Changbin; Han; Earattack; Chan's (Take a Chance)	Maxident	2022	
"Comflex"	Stray Kids	Bang Chan, Changbin, Han	Bang Chan; Changbin; Han; Millionboy	Rock-Star	2023	
"Cypher" ‡ #	Changbin	Changbin	Changbin; Bang Chan; Versachoi	SKZ-Record track	2020	
"District 9" †	Stray Kids	Bang Chan, Changbin, Han	Bang Chan; Changbin; Han; Trippy	I Am Not; Unveil Stray Kids	2018	
"DLC"	Stray Kids	Changbin, Restart	Changbin; Restart	5-Star	2023	
"Domino"	Stray Kids	Bang Chan, Changbin, Han	Bang Chan; Changbin; Han; Versachoi	Noeasy; Christmas EveL (Note: The English ver. was included in this album.)	2021	
"Doodle" ‡	Changbin	Changbin	Changbin; Millionboy	SKZ-Replay	2022	
"Double Knot" † ⁂	Stray Kids	Bang Chan, Changbin, Han	Bang Chan; Changbin; Han; Nick Furlong; DallasK	Clé: Levanter (Note: previously released by pre-debut 3Racha in 2017); Step Out of Clé (Note: The English version was released in this album); SKZ2020 (Note: The Japanese ver. was released in this album)	2019	
"Easy"	Stray Kids	Bang Chan, Changbin, Han	Bang Chan; Changbin; Han; Mike Daley; Mike J Henry Oyekanmi; Mitchell Owens	Go Live	2020	
"Ex"	Stray Kids	Bang Chan, Changbin	Bang Chan; Changbin; HotSauce	In Life	2020	
"Falling Up"	Stray Kids	Bang Chan, Changbin, KM Markit	Bang Chan; Changbin; Restart; Chae Gang-hae	Giant (Note: This song was also used as the ending theme song for Tower of God season 2)	2024	
"Falling Up" (English version)	Stray Kids	Bang Chan, Changbin	Bang Chan; Changbin; Restart; Chae Gang-hae	Giant	2024	
"Falling Up" (Korean version) †	Stray Kids	Bang Chan, Changbin	Bang Chan; Changbin; Restart; Chae Gang-hae	Tower of God Season 2 Battle OST	2024	
"Fam"	Stray Kids	Bang Chan, Changbin, Han, KM Markit	Bang Chan; Changbin; Han; Versachoi	All In	2020	
"Fam" (Korean version) #	Stray Kids	Bang Chan, Changbin, Han	Bang Chan; Changbin; Han; Versachoi	Non-album single (Note: STRAY KIDS 2ND WORLD SEOUL SPECIAL UNVEIL 11)	2022	
"Fly High" (비상)	Changbin	Changbin, Kim Woo-young, Lee Hyun-joon, Park So-hyuk, Jo Kyu-so, Cha Ji-eun, Kim Ye-ji	Changbin; Restart; Chae Gang-hae	Non-album single	2023	
"For You"	Stray Kids	Bang Chan, Changbin, Han, Hyunjin, Lee Know, Seungmin, I.N, Felix	Bang Chan; Changbin; Han; Hyunjin; Lee Know; Seungmin; I.N; Felix	SKZ2021	2021	
"Freeze" (땡)	Stray Kids	Bang Chan, Changbin, Han	Bang Chan; Changbin; Han; Trippy	Oddinary	2022	
"Get Cool"	Stray Kids	Inner Child, Bang Chan, Changbin, Han	Yoon Jong-sung (MonoTree); Inner Child (MonoTree); Song Ha-eun; Totem; Bang Chan; Changbin; Han	I Am You; Unveil Stray Kids	2018	
"Giant" †	Stray Kids	Bang Chan, Changbin, Han, Yohei	Bang Chan; Changbin; Han; Restart; Chae Kang-hae	Giant	2024	
"Give Me Your TMI"	Stray Kids	Bang Chan, Changbin, Han	Bang Chan; Changbin; Han; Tak; 1Take	Maxident	2022	
"Glow"	Stray Kids	Changbin, Felix, Lee Know	Bang Chan; This N That	Mixtape	2018	
"Go Live" (GO生)	Stray Kids	Bang Chan, Changbin, Han	Bang Chan; Changbin; Han; Amanda MNDR Warner; Peter Wade Keusch	Go Live	2020	
"God's Menu" (神메뉴; 神メニュー) † ⁂	Stray Kids	Bang Chan, Changbin, Han	Bang Chan; Changbin; Han; Versachoi	Go Live; All In (Note: The Japanese version was included in this album)	2020	
"Grow Up"	Stray Kids	Bang Chan, Changbin, Han	Bang Chan; Changbin; Han; Trippy	I Am Not; Unveil Stray Kids	2018	
"Grr" (총량의법칙)	Stray Kids	Bang Chan, Changbin, Han	Bang Chan; Changbin; Han; Armadillo; Trippy; 1Take	Mixtape	2018	
"Hall of Fame" (위인전)	Stray Kids	Bang Chan, Changbin, Han	Bang Chan; Changbin; Han; Versachoi	5-Star	2023	
"Hallucination"	I.N	Changbin, I.N, Restart	Changbin; I.N; Chae Gang-hae; Restart	Hop	2024	
"Hellevator" †	Stray Kids	Armadilo, Bang Chan, Changbin, Han	Armadillo; Bang Chan; Changbin; Han; Rangga	Mixtape; Unveil Stray Kids	2017	
"Hello Stranger"	Stray Kids	Bang Chan, Changbin, Han	Bang Chan; Changbin; Han; Hong Ji-sang	Pop Out Boy! OST Part 1	2020	
"Hero's Soup" (해장국)	Stray Kids	Bang Chan, Changbin, Han	Bang Chan; Changbin; Han; Lee Hae-sol	I Am You	2018	
"Heyday" (Prod. Czaer)	3Racha	Bang Chan, Changbin, Han	Czaer; MarkAlong; Stephen Lee; Bashment YC; Owo; Bang Chan; Changbin; Han	Street Man Fighter Original Vol. 4 (Crew Songs)	2022	
"Hoodie Season"	Stray Kids	Bang Chan, Changbin, Han, Hyunjin, Lee Know, Seungmin, I.N, Felix	Bang Chan; Changbin; Han; Hyunjin; Lee Know eungmin I.N; Felix	SKZ2021	2021	
"I Am You" †	Stray Kids	Bang Chan, Changbin, Han	Bang Chan; Changbin; Han; Lee Woo-min "Collapsedone"; Justin Reinstein; KZ; Zene The Zilla	I Am You; Unveil Stray Kids	2018	
"I Like It"	Stray Kids	Bang Chan, Changbin, Han, JBach	Bang Chan; Changbin; Han; Nathan Cunningham; Marc Sibley; JBach	Ate	2024	
"Insomnia" (불면증)	Stray Kids	Bang Chan, Changbin, Han	Bang Chan; Changbin; Han; KZ; Space One	I Am Who	2018	
"Item"	Stray Kids	Bang Chan, Changbin, Han	Bang Chan; Changbin; Han; Versachoi	5-Star	2023	
"Jjam"	Stray Kids	Bang Chan, Changbin	Bang Chan; Changbin; Restart; Chae Gang-hae	Ate	2024	
"Just Breathe" †	Sky-Hi, 3Racha	Bang Chan, Changbin, Han, Sky-Hi	Bang Chan; Changbin; Han; Sky-Hi	The Debut	2022	
"Lalalala" (락 (樂)) †	Stray Kids	Bang Chan, Changbin, Han	Bang Chan; Changbin; Han; Versachoi; Kevin Gomringer; Tim Gomringer; Luis Bacque	Rock-Star	2023	
"Lalalala" (Rock version)	Stray Kids	Bang Chan, Changbin, Han	Bang Chan; Changbin; Han; Versachoi; Kevin Gomringer; Tim Gomringer; Luis Bacque	Rock-Star	2023	
"Leave"	Stray Kids	Bang Chan, Changbin	Bang Chan; Changbin; Jun2	Rock-Star	2023	
"Levanter" †	Stray Kids	Bang Chan, Changbin, Han, JYP, Herz Analog	Bang Chan; Changbin; Han; Hong Ji-sang	Clé: Levanter; Step Out of Clé (Note: The English ver. was included in this album); SKZ2020 (Note: The Japanese ver. was included in this album)	2019	
"Lonely St."	Stray Kids	Bang Chan, Changbin	Bang Chan; Changbin; Jun2	Oddinary	2022	
"Lose My Breath" ((featuring Charlie Puth) version) †	Stray Kids, Charlie Puth	Bang Chan, Changbin, Han, Hindlin Jacob Kasher, Charlie Puth, Salomon Naliya	Charlie Puth; Bang Chan; Changbin; Han; Johnny Goldstein	Non-album single	2024	
"Lose My Breath" (Stray Kids version)†	Stray Kids	Bang Chan, Changbin, Han, Hindlin Jacob Kasher, Charlie Puth, Salomon Naliya	Charlie Puth; Bang Chan; Changbin; Han; Johnny Goldstein	Non-album single	2024	
"M.I.A."	Stray Kids	Bang Chan, Changbin, Han	Bang Chan; Changbin; Han; Kim Mong-e	I Am Who	2018	
"Maknae on Top" (막내온탑) #	I.N	Bang Chan, Changbin, I.N	Bang Chan	SKZ-Player	2021	
"Maniac" † ⁂	Stray Kids	Bang Chan, Changbin, Han	Bang Chan; Changbin; Han; Versachoi	Oddinary; Circus (Note: The Japanese ver. was released in this album)	2022	
"Matryoshka" #	3Racha	Bang Chan, Changbin, Han	Bang Chan; Changbin; Han	Non-album single (Note: Performed during Stray Kids reality show Ep. 6)	2017	
"Maze of Memories" (잠깐의 고요)	Stray Kids	Bang Chan, Changbin, Han	Bang Chan; Changbin; Han; J;Key	Clé 1: Miroh	2019	
"Megaverse"	Stray Kids	Bang Chan, Changbin, Han	Bang Chan; Changbin; Han; Versachoi	Rock-Star	2023	
"Miroh" †	Stray Kids	Bang Chan, Changbin, Han	Bang Chan; Changbin; Han; Brian Atwood	Clé 1: Miroh; Unveil Stray Kids	2019	
"Mirror"	Stray Kids	Bang Chan, Changbin, Han	Bang Chan; Changbin; Han; Lee Woo-min "Collapsedone"; Fredrik "Fredro" Ödesjö	I Am Not	2018	
"Mirror Mirror" †	F. Hero, Milli featuring Changbin	Auttakorn Deachmak; Changbin; Danupha Kanateerakul; Nattawut Srimhok		Non-album single	2021	
"Mixtape#1"	Stray Kids	Bang Chan, Changbin, Han, Hyunjin, Lee Know, Seungmin, I.N, Felix, Woojin	Bang Chan; Changbin; Han; Hyunjin; Lee Know; Seungmin; I.N; Felix; Woojin	I Am Not; Clé 2: Yellow Wood (Note: Later was included in the album in 2019.)	2018	
"Mixtape#2"	Stray Kids	Bang Chan, Changbin, Han, Hyunjin, Lee Know, Seungmin, I.N, Felix, Woojin	Bang Chan; Changbin; Han; Hyunjin; Lee Know; Seungmin; I.N; Felix; Woojin	I Am Who; Clé 2: Yellow Wood (Note: Later was included in this album in 2019.)	2018	
"Mixtape#3"	Stray Kids	Bang Chan, Changbin, Han, Hyunjin, Lee Know, Seungmin, I.N, Felix, Woojin	Bang Chan; Changbin; Han; Hyunjin; Lee Know; Seungmin; I.N; Felix; Woojin	I Am You; Clé 2: Yellow Wood (Note: Later was included in this album in 2019.)	2018	
"Mixtape#4"	Stray Kids	Bang Chan, Changbin, Han, Hyunjin, Lee Know, Seungmin, I.N, Felix, Woojin	Bang Chan; Changbin; Han; Hyunjin; Lee Know; Seungmin; I.N; Felix; Woojin	Clé 1: Miroh; Clé 2: Yellow Wood (Note: Later was included in this album in 2019.)	2019	
"Mixtape#5"	Stray Kids	Bang Chan, Changbin, Han, Hyunjin, Lee Know, Seungmin, I.N, Felix	Bang Chan; Changbin; Han; Hyunjin; Lee Know; Seungmin; I.N; Felix	Clé: Levanter	2019	
"Mixtape: Oh" (애)†	Stray Kids	Bang Chan, Changbin, Han	Bang Chan; Changbin; Han; Kobee; Holy M	Non-album single (Note: Later was included in the album Noeasy)	2021	
"Mixtape: On Track" (바보라도 알아) †	Stray Kids	Changbin, KZ, B.O.	Changbin; KZ; Taebongi; B.O.	Go Live	2020	
"Mixtape: Time Out" †	Stray Kids	Bang Chan, Changbin, Han	Bang Chan; Changbin; Han; Versachoi; Jun2	Non-album single (Note: Released on YouTube and YouTube Music only in 2022, but later got included in Stray Kids' 5-Star album)	2022	
"Mountains"	Stray Kids	Bang Chan, Changbin, Han	Bang Chan; Changbin; Han; Versachoi	Ate	2024	
"Muddy Water"	Changbin, Hyunjin, Han, Felix	Changbin, Hyunjin, Han, Felix	Changbin; Hyunjin; Han; Felix; Millionboy	Oddinary	2022	
"My Pace" † ⁂	Stray Kids	Bang Chan, Changbin, Han, JYP	Bang Chan; Changbin; Han; Earattack; Larmook	I Am Who; Unveil Stray Kids; SKZ2020 (Note: The Japanese ver. was included in this album)	2018	
"My Side" (편)	Stray Kids	Bang Chan, Changbin, Han	Bang Chan; Changbin; Han; Frants	I Am You	2018	
"My Universe"	Seungmin, I.N featuring Changbin	Iggy, Ung Kim, Changbin, Seungmin, I.N	Iggy; Ung Kim	In Life	2020	
"N/S" (극과 극)	Stray Kids	Bang Chan, Changbin, Han	Bang Chan; Changbin; Han; Slo	I Am You	2018	
"Neverending Story" (끝나지 않을 이야기)	Stray Kids	Park Se-joon, Taibian, Changbin	Taibian; Baaq; CHKmate	Extraordinary You OST	2019	
"Nevermind"	Yao Chen	Blazo	Bang Chan; Changbin; Han	Non-album single	2021	
"Night"	Stray Kids	Bang Chan, Changbin, Han, D&H (Purple Night)	Bang Chan; Changbin; Han; Versachoi	Giant (Note: This song was also used as the opening theme song for Tower of God season 2)	2024	
"Night" (Korean version) †	Stray Kids	Bang Chan, Changbin, Han	Bang Chan; Changbin; Han; Versachoi	Tower of God Season 2 Battle OST	2024	
"Night" (English version)	Stray Kids	Bang Chan, Changbin, Han	Bang Chan; Changbin; Han; Versachoi	Giant	2024	
"One Day"	Stray Kids	Changbin, Lee Joon-seok, KM-Markit	Changbin; Bang Chan; Lee Joon-seok	All In	2020	
"Pacemaker"	Stray Kids	Bang Chan, Changbin, Han, Jinli (Full8loom)	Bang Chan; Changbin; Han; Jinri (Full8loom); Glory Face (Full8loom); Jake (ARTiffect)	Go Live	2020	
"Party's Not Over" #	Stray Kids	Changbin, Restart, Seungmin	Changbin; Restart; Chae Gang-hae	SKZ-Record and SKZ-Player track	2023	
"Paradise"	NiziU	Bang Chan, Changbin, Han, Akira	Bang Chan; Changbin; Han	Doraemon: Nobita's Sky Utopia; Coconut	2023	
"Paradise" (Korean version)	NiziU	Bang Chan, Changbin, Han, Akira	Bang Chan; Changbin; Han	Press Play	2023	
"Phobia"	Stray Kids	Bang Chan, Versa Choi, Changbin, Han	Versachoi; Albin Nordqvist	Go Live	2020	
"Placebo"	Stray Kids	Bang Chan, Changbin, Han, Hyunjin, Lee Know, Seungmin, I.N, Felix	Bang Chan; Changbin; Han; Hyunjin; Lee Know; Seungmin; I.N; Felix	SKZ2021	2021	
"Playing with Colours" (물감놀이)	3Racha, Lee Min-hyuk, Hongjoong	Lee Min-hyuk, Bang Chan, Changbin, Han, Hong-joong	Lee Min-hyuk; Bang Chan; Changbin; Han; Hong-joong	Non-album single (Note: Performed during Kingdom: Legendary War Round 1 Part.1)	2021	
"Piece of a Puzzle" (조각) #	Changbin; Seungmin	Changbin, Seungmin	Changbin; Seungmin; Bang Chan	SKZ-Replay	2021	
"Question"	Stray Kids	Bang Chan, Changbin, Han	Bang Chan; Changbin; Han; HotSauce	I Am Who	2018	
"Road Not Taken"(밟힌 적 없는 길)	Stray Kids	Bang Chan, Changbin, Han	Matthew Tishler; Andrew; Underberg; Crash Cove	Clé 2: Yellow Wood	2019	
"Rock" (돌)	Stray Kids	Bang Chan, Changbin, Han	Bang Chan; Changbin; Han; Glory Face (Full8loom)	I Am Not	2018	
"Runner's High"	3Racha	Bang Chan, Changbin, Han	Bang Chan; Changbin; Han	Non-album single (Note: Performed during Stray Kids reality show Ep. 1)	2017	
"Scars" (Japanese version)	Stray Kids	Bang Chan, Changbin, Han, KM Markit	Armadillo; Bang Chan; Changbin; Han	The Sound	2021	
"Scars" (Korean version) †	Stray Kids	Bang Chan, Changbin, Han	Armadillo; Bang Chan; Changbin; Han	SKZ2021	2021	
"School Life"	Stray Kids	Lim Jeong-seok, Bang Chan, Changbin, Han, Woojin, I.N	Brandon P. Lowry; Tobias Karlsson; Matthew Engst; Han; Woojin; Sangmi Kim	Mixtape	2018	
"S-Class" †	Stray Kids	Bang Chan, Changbin, Han	Bang Chan; Changbin; Han; Chae Gang-hae; Restart	5-Star	2023	
"Sensitive Boss" (Yeah민Boss) #	Changbin, I.N	Changbin, I.N	Changbin; I.N; Bang Chan	SKZ-Record track	2020	
"Side Effects" †	Stray Kids	Bang Chan, Changbin, Han	Bang Chan; Changbin; Han; Tak; 1Take	Clé 2: Yellow Wood; Unveil Stray Kids	2019	
"Silent Cry" ⁂	Stray Kids	Bang Chan, Changbin, Han	Bang Chan; Changbin; Han; Hong Ji-sang	Noeasy; Circus (Note: Later the Japanese ver. was included in this album in 2022.)	2021	
"SKZ Anthem" #	Stray Kids	Bang Chan, Changbin, Han	Bang Chan; Changbin; Han	Non-album single (Note: Opening anthem for Stray Kids concerts from 2018 until 2023)	2018	
"Slash"	Stray Kids	Bang Chan, Changbin, Han	Bang Chan; Changbin; Han; Versachoi	Deadpool & Wolverine	2024	
"Snain" (비바람) #	Changbin, Felix, Seungmin	Changbin, Restart	Changbin; Restart; Chae Gang-hae	SKZ-Record track	2023	
"Social Path" (Featuring Lisa) †	Stray Kids and Lisa	Bang Chan, Changbin, Han, Yohei	Bang Chan; Changbin; Han; Versachoi	Social Path / Super Bowl (Japanese Ver.)	2023	
"Social Path" (Korean version featuring Lisa)	Stray Kids and Lisa	Bang Chan, Changbin, Han	Bang Chan; Changbin; Han; Versachoi	Rock-Star	2023	
"Sorry, I Love You" (좋아해서 미안) ‡	Stray Kids	Changbin	Changbin; Millionboy	Noeasy	2021	
"The Sound" †	Stray Kids	Bang Chan, Changbin, Han, D&H, Chris Larocca	Bang Chan; Changbin; Han; Zack Djurich; Kyle Reynolds; Chris LaRocca	The Sound	2023	
"The Sound" (Korean version)	Stray Kids	Bang Chan, Changbin, Han	Bang Chan; Changbin; Han; Zack Djurich; Kyle Reynolds; Chris LaRocca	5-Star	2023	
"Spread My Wings" (어린 날개)	Stray Kids	Bang Chan, Changbin, Han	Bang Chan; Changbin; Han; Trippy	Mixtape	2018	
"Ssick"	Stray Kids	Bang Chan, Changbin, Han	Bang Chan; Changbin; Han; ByHVN (153/Joombas)	Noeasy	2021	
"Star Lost"	Stray Kids	Bang Chan, Changbin, Han, Kalos, Earattack	Earattack; DaviDior	Noeasy	2021	
"Stop"	Stray Kids	Bang Chan, Changbin, Han	Bang Chan; Changbin; Han; Matthew Tishler; Andrew Underberg; Crash Cove	Clé: Levanter	2019	
"Stray Kids"	Stray Kids	Bang Chan, Changbin, Han	Bang Chan; Changbin; Han; DallasK; Ronnie Icon	Ate	2024	
"Streetlight" ‡ #	Changbin featuring Bang Chan	Changbin	Changbin; Bang Chan	SKZ-Replay	2020	
"Super Board"	Stray Kids	Bang Chan, Changbin, Han	Bang Chan; Changbin; Han; Kim Park Chella	Maxident	2022	
"Super Bowl" † ⁂	Stray Kids	Bang Chan, Changbin, Han, Felix	Bang Chan; Changbin; Han; Zack Djurich	5-Star; Social Path / Super Bowl (Japanese Ver.)	2023	
"Surfin'"	Changbin, Lee Know, Felix	Changbin, Lee Know, Felix	Changbin; Lee Know; Felix; Versachoi	Noeasy	2021	
"Ta" (타)	Stray Kids	Bang Chan, Changbin, Han	Bang Chan; Changbin; Han; Lee Hae-sol	Go Live	2020	
"There"	Stray Kids	Bang Chan, Changbin, KM Markit	Bang Chan; Changbin; Jun2	The Sound	2023	
"Thunderous" † ⁂	Stray Kids	Bang Chan, Changbin, Han	Bang Chan; Changbin; Han; HotSauce	Noeasy; The Sound	2021	
"TMT" (별생각)	Stray Kids	Bang Chan, Changbin, Han	Bang Chan; Changbin; Han; Time; Gravvity	Clé 2: Yellow Wood	2019	
"Top" †	Stray Kids	Armadilo, Bang Chan, Changbin, Han, KM Markit	Armadillo; Bang Chan; Changbin; Han; Rangga; Gwon Yeong-chan	All In (Note: The Japanese version was included in this EP and the English ver. was released as a single on May 20, 2020.)	2020	
"Top" (Korean version)†	Stray Kids	Armadilo, Bang Chan, Changbin, Han, KM Markit	Armadillo; Bang Chan; Changbin; Han; Rangga; Gwon Yeong-chan	Tower of God OST; Go Live	2020	
"Topline" (featuring Tiger JK)	Stray Kids, Tiger JK	Bang Chan, Changbin, Han, Tiger JK	Bang Chan; Changbin; Han; Versachoi	5-Star	2023	
"The Tortoise and the Hare"	Stray Kids	Bang Chan, Changbin, Han	Bang Chan; Changbin; Han; Amanda MNDR Warner; Peter Wade Keusch	In Life	2020	
"U" featuring Tablo	Stray Kids, Tablo	Bang Chan, Changbin, Han, Tablo, JBach	Bang Chan; Changbin; Han; JBach; Marc Sibley; Nathan Cunningham	Hop	2024	
"Ultra" ‡	Changbin	Changbin	Changbin; Chae Gang-hae; Restart	Hop	2024	
"Up All Night" #	Bang Chan, Changbin, Felix, Seungmin	Bang Chan, Changbin	Bang Chan; Nick Lee; Josh Wei	SKZ-Replay	2022	
"VAY" ‡	Itzy featuring Changbin	Changbin	Changbin; Chae Gang-hae; Restart	Gold	2024	
"Venom" (거미줄) ⁂	Stray Kids	Bang Chan, Changbin, Han	Bang Chan; Changbin; Han; DallasK	Oddinary; Circus	2022	
"The View"	Stray Kids	Bang Chan, Changbin, Han, Krysta Youngs	Bang Chan; Changbin; Han; TELYKast; Krysta Youngs	Noeasy	2021	
"Victory Song"	Stray Kids	Bang Chan, Changbin, Han	Bang Chan; Changbin; Han; Earattack; Larmook	Clé 1: Miroh; Unveil Stray Kids	2019	
"Voices"	Stray Kids	Bang Chan, Changbin, Han	Bang Chan; Changbin; Han; Trippy	I Am Who	2019	
"Walkin on Water" †	Stray Kids	Bang Chan, Changbin, Han	Bang Chan; Changbin; Han; Restart; Chae Gang-hae	Hop	2024	
"Walkin on Water" (Hip version)	Stray Kids	Bang Chan, Changbin, Han	Bang Chan; Changbin; Han; Restart; Chae Gang-hae	Hop	2024	
"We Go"	3Racha	Bang Chan, Changbin, Han	Bang Chan; Changbin; Han; Nick Furlong; DallasK	In Life	2020	
"Why?"	Stray Kids	Bang Chan, Changbin, Han, Yohei, D&H	Bang Chan; Changbin; Han; Hong Ji-sang	Re:Revenge- In the End of Desire OST; Giant	2024	
"Wo De Shi Dai"	Show Lo	Bang Chan, Changbin, Han	Bang Chan; Changbin; Han	No Idea	2019	
"Wolfgang"	Stray Kids	Bang Chan, Changbin, Han	Bang Chan; Changbin; Han; Versachoi	Kingdom: Legendary War (Note: performed in the "Finale: Who Is the King?"); Noeasy	2021	
"Yayaya"	Stray Kids	Bang Chan, Changbin, Han, Ahn Tae Seok	Earattack; Bang Chan; Changbin; Han	Mixtape	2018	
"Yeah" #	3Racha	Bang Chan, Changbin, Han	Bang Chan; Changbin; Han	Non-album single (Note: Performed during KCON 2022 LA)	2022	
"Yolo-Konde"	JO1	JO1	Bang Chan; Changbin; Han	Non-album single	2022	
"Yes Seo" (명) ‡ #	Changbin	Changbin	Changbin; Chae Gang-hae; Restart	Unreleased song	2023	
"You Can Stay"	Stray Kids	Bang Chan, Changbin, Han	Bang Chan; Changbin; Han; Cook Classics	Clé: Levanter	2019	
"You."	Stray Kids	Changbin, Hyunjin, I.N	Changbin; Hyunjin; I.N; Hong Ji-sang	I Am You	2018	
"You...Like the Wind" (바람 같은 너)	Yoon Ji-sung featuring Changbin	Code 9, Kalix, Changbin	Code 9 Kalix	Aside	2019	
"Your Eyes" †	Stray Kids	Bang Chan, Changbin, Han, KM Markit	Bang Chan; Changbin; Jun2	Circus	2022	
"Zone" #	Bang Chan, Changbin, Han	Bang Chan, Changbin, Han	Bang Chan; Changbin; Han	SKZ-Replay	2022	

== See also ==
- List of songs recorded by Stray Kids
