= Giant (Stray Kids song) =

Single by Stray Kids

from the album Giant
- Language: Japanese; English; Korean
- Released: November 13, 2024
- Studio: JYPE (Seoul); Channie's "Room" (Seoul)
- Genre: Boom bap; dubstep
- Length: 2:54
- Label: Epic Japan
- Composers: Bang Chan; Changbin; Han; Restart; Chae Gang-hae
- Lyricists: Bang Chan; Changbin; Han; Yohei

Stray Kids singles chronology
| "Come Play" (2024) | "Giant" (2024) | "Walkin on Water" (2024) |

Music video
- "Giant" on YouTube

"Giant" is a song by South Korean boy band Stray Kids, taken from their second Japanese-language studio album Giant (2024). It was released as a single through Epic Records Japan on November 13, 2024, concurrently with the album and its music video.

== Background and release ==
On September 30, 2024, Stray Kids announced their second Japanese-language studio album, titled Giant. The track list was revealed on October 11, which the title track "Giant" appears as the first track. The song was released alongside the album on November 13. The Korean version was included on the group's album single Mixtape: Dominate (2025).

== Composition ==
Stray Kids' in-house production team 3Racha—Bang Chan, Changbin, and Han—wrote "Giant" alongside Restart and Chae Gang-hae. Yohei was in charge of the song's Japanese lyrics. "Giant" is a combination of boom bap and dubstep with strong bass and synthesizer sounds. Lyrically, the song expresses "working hard and refusing to take anything for granted, no matter how famous you get."

== Music video ==
An accompanying music video for "Giant" premiered on November 13, 2024, in conjunction with the album and the song releases. Directed by Novvkim, the video depicts Stray Kids in the underground, where they are built what looks like an upscaled ant farm. The members also collect and gather bejewelled eggs to complete their base.

== Live performances ==
Stray Kids included "Giant" on the setlist on the Japan shows of their Dominate World Tour, where they gave the debut performance at Tokyo Dome on November 14, 2024. The group performed the song for the first time on television at Best Artist 2024 on November 30, and later 2024 FNS Music Festival on December 4.

== Credits and personnel ==
Personnel

- Stray Kids – vocals, background vocals
  - Bang Chan (3Racha) – lyrics, composition, arrangement, instruments, computer programming, vocal direction, vocal editing, recording
  - Changbin (3Racha) – lyrics, composition, vocal direction
  - Han (3Racha) – lyrics, composition, vocal direction
- Yohei – lyrics (Japanese version)
- Restart – composition, arrangement, instruments, computer programming, vocal direction
- Chae Gang-hae – composition, arrangement, instruments, computer programming
- Lee Kyeong-won – vocal editing
- Choi Hye-jin – recording
- Goo Hye-jin – recording
- Yoon Won-kwon – mixing
- Kwon Nam-woo – mastering

Locations

- JYPE Studios – recording
- Channie's "Room" – recording
- MadMiix – mixing
- 821 Sound Mastering – mastering

== Charts ==
Chart performance for "Giant"
| Chart (2024–2025) | Peak position |
|---|---|
| Japan Hot 100 (Billboard) | 82 |
| Japan Digital Singles (Oricon) | 26 |
| South Korea BGM (Circle) Korean version | 176 |
| South Korea Download (Circle) Korean version | 78 |
| UK Singles Sales (OCC) | 53 |
| US World Digital Song Sales (Billboard) | 2 |
