= Giant (Stray Kids album) =

- Standard cover

Studio album by Stray Kids
- Released: November 13, 2024
- Studio: JYPE (Seoul); Channie's "Room" (Seoul); Jisang's (Seoul)
- Length: 31:29
- Language: Japanese; English
- Label: Epic Japan
- Producer: 3Racha; Chae Gang-hae; DallasK; Hong Ji-sang; Kim Ju-hyeong; Restart; Versachoi

Stray Kids chronology
Ate (2024)	Giant (2024)	Hop (2024)

Singles from Giant
- 1. "Night" Released: October 7, 2024; 2. "Falling Up" Released: October 7, 2024; 3. "Giant" Released: November 13, 2024

Giant is the second Japanese-language studio album and fifth overall by South Korean boy band Stray Kids. It was released through Epic Records Japan on November 13, 2024, following their EP Social Path / Super Bowl (Japanese Ver.) (2023). The album was supported by three singles: "Night" and "Falling Up", themes for the "Workshop Battle" arc of the second season of Kami no Tō: Tower of God, and the title track. Commercially, Giant topped both Oricon Albums Chart and Billboard Japan Hot Albums with 335,000 copies, and received double platinum certification from the Recording Industry Association of Japan (RIAJ).

== Background and release ==
On September 30, 2024, the Stray Kids Japan official X account posted a mysterious image of throne with the text "King Giant". Shortly on the same day, the group announced their second Japanese-language studio album, titled Giant, which would be released on November 13, 2024, a day before their first show in Tokyo, Japan of their third world tour Dominate World Tour. Pre-orders of the album began on the same day, coming in 11 versions: Limited A and B, standard, and eight-member solo covers. From October 1 to 3, 7 to 11, and 15 to 18 they posted series of "dark", "elegant" and "royalty" individual and group teaser images and each member's solo cover.

The dual lead singles from Giant, "Night" and "Falling Up", were released on October 7 in three versions simultaneously: Japanese, English, and Korean, which the Japanese and English versions were included on the album. "Night" serves as the opening theme while "Falling Up" as ending theme for the second arc "Workshop Battle" of the second season of the anime series Kami no Tō: Tower of God. On October 11, Stray Kids revealed each edition's cover artworks and track list for the album, which additionally included "Why?", a theme song for Japanese television drama Re: Revenge – Yokubo no Hate ni (2024), and the Japanese version of "Chk Chk Boom". Alongside the album, an accompanying music video for the title track "Giant" premiered on November 13, while "Christmas Love" music video uploaded on December 9.

== Promotion ==
To commemorate the release of Giant, Stray Kids partnered with several Japanese companies: Suntory, HEP Five, Shibuya Tsutaya, Tokyo Dome City, Spotify Japan and Miyashita Park, and NewDays for promotional campaign and pop-up stores between November and December 2024. The group also collaborated with Central Japan Railway Company (JR Central) for special voice on Tokaido Shinkansen and advertisements at the stations between Tokyo and Shin-Ōsaka Stations. Stray Kids surprisingly paid a visit to Shibuya Tsutaya, Tower Records Japan, and Miyashita Park in Shibuya, Tokyo on November 13 for the album promotion.

In support of Giant, Stray Kids embarked on their Dominate World Tour at Tokyo Dome and Kyocera Dome Osaka, Japan in November–December 2024, where they debuted the performance of "Giant". The group later performed the title track on music shows Best Artist 2024 on November 30, and 2024 FNS Music Festival on December 4. They also appeared on the variety show Uwa! Dama Sareta Taishō 2024 Winter, and gave interviews for news program World Business Satellite. A year later, the band performed the album's track "Christmas Love" at CDTV Live! Live! Christmas Love Song Fes. on December 15, 2025.

== Commercial performance ==
According to Billboard Japan, Giant has sold 264,390 physical copies and 1,886 digital sales between November 11 to 13, 2024. Following the week ended on November 17, the album debuted at number one on the Hot Albums chart with 446,002 physical copies and 3,168 digital sales, which topped the Top Album Sales and reached number three on the Download Albums. Oricon reported that Giant was the best-selling album in Japan on November 12, 2024, the album's flying get date, with 185,409 copies. Later, the album debuted at number one on the Weekly Album Chart and Combined Albums Chart, the fourth album to so, selling 335,000 copies. As of January 2025, Giant was certified double platinum for shipment by the Recording Industry Association of Japan (RIAJ).

== Accolades ==
List of awards and nominations received by Giant
Ceremony	Year	Category	Result	Ref.
Japan Gold Disc Award	2025	Best 3 Albums (Asia)	Won	

== Track listing ==
Giant track listing
No.	Title	Lyrics	Music	Arrangement	Length
1.	"Giant"	Bang Chan (3Racha); Changbin (3Racha); Han (3Racha); Yohei	Bang Chan; Changbin; Han; Restart; Chae Gang-hae	Restart; Chae; Bang Chan	2:54
2.	"Chk Chk Boom" (Japanese version)	Bang Chan; Changbin; Han; D&H (Purple Night); Shunsuke Takai	Bang Chan; Changbin; Han; Dallas Koehlke; Ronnie Icon; BB Elliot	DallasK; Bang Chan; Restart; Chae	2:29
3.	"Night"	Bang Chan; Changbin; Han; D&H	Bang Chan; Changbin; Han; Versachoi	Versachoi	2:55
4.	"Falling Up"	Bang Chan; Changbin; KM-Markit	Bang Chan; Changbin; Restart; Chae	Restart; Chae; Bang Chan	3:12
5.	"Why?"	Bang Chan; Changbin; Han; D&H; Yohei	Bang Chan; Changbin; Han; Hong Ji-sang	Hong	3:49
6.	"Saiyan"	Han; Bang Chan; KM-Markit	Han; Bang Chan; Versachoi	Bang Chan; Versachoi	3:39
7.	"Ai o Kureta no ni, Naze" (愛をくれたのに、なぜ)	Changbin; Bang Chan; KM-Markit	Changbin; Bang Chan; Kim Ju-hyeong	Kim	3:15
8.	"Christmas Love"	Bang Chan; Yohei	Bang Chan; Versachoi	Versachoi	3:06
9.	"Night" (English version)	Bang Chan; Changbin; Han; Sophia Pae	Bang Chan; Changbin; Han; Versachoi	Versachoi	2:55
10.	"Falling Up" (English version)	Bang Chan; Changbin; Pae	Bang Chan; Changbin; Restart; Chae	Restart; Chae; Bang Chan	3:10
Total length:					31:29

Giant FC limited bonus track
No.	Title	Music	Arrangement	Length
11.	"Christmas Love" (instrumental)	Bang Chan; Versachoi	Versachoi	3:06
Total length:				34:35

Giant Limited A bonus track (Blu-ray)
No.	Title	Director(s)	Length
1.	"Jacket shooting making movie"
2.	"Jacket shooting making movie" (relay cam version)
3.	"Giant" (recording making movie)
4.	"Christmas Love" (recording making movie)
5.	"Social Path" (music video)	Novvkim	3:22
6.	"Social Path" (music video making movie)
Total length:			100:29

== Credits and personnel ==
Musicians

- Stray Kids – lead vocals, background vocals (1, 5)
  - Bang Chan (3Racha) – background vocals (2, 4, 8–10), instruments (1–2, 6), computer programming (1, 6), vocal direction (1, 3–4, 6–10)
  - Changbin (3Racha) – background vocals (2), vocal direction (1, 3–4, 7, 9–10)
  - Han (3Racha) – background vocals (2), vocal direction (1, 3–4, 6, 9–10)
  - Felix – background vocals (2)
  - I.N – background vocals (7)
- Shun Kusakawa – background vocals (7)
- Restart – instruments (1–2, 4, 10), computer programming (1, 4, 10), vocal direction (4, 10)
- Chae Gang-hae – instruments (1–2, 4, 10), computer programming (1, 4, 10)
- DallasK – instruments (2)
- Versachoi – instruments (6, 8), computer programming (3, 6, 8–9), piano (3, 9), synthesizer (3, 9), vocal direction (3, 8–9)
- Rha Kyung-weoi – guitar (3, 7, 9), bass (3, 9)
- Hong Ji-sang – computer programming (5), electric guitar (5), keyboard (5), vocal direction (5)
- Kim Ju-hyeong – computer programming (7), synthesizer (7), keyboard (7), bass (7), drum (7)

Technical

- Lee Kyeong-won – digital editing (1–4, 6, 8–10)
- Bang Chan (3Racha) – digital editing (1–4, 6–10), recording (1–2, 6–8)
- Eom Se-hee – digital editing (7), recording (2, 7)
- Kim Seon-young – digital editing (8)
- Choi Hye-jin – recording (1, 7)
- Goo Hye-jin – recording (1–3, 5–9)
- Lim Chan-mi – recording (3–4, 10)
- Yoon Won-kwon – mixing (1, 3–4, 6, 8–10)
- Manny Marroquin – mixing (2)
- Lee Tae-sub – mixing (5)
- Shin Bong-won – mixing (7)
- Chris Galland – mix engineering (2)
  - Ramiro Fernandez-Seoane – assistant
- Park Nam-joon – mix engineering (7)
- Kwon Nam-woo – mastering (1, 3–10)
- Dave Kutch – mastering (2)

Locations

- JYPE Studios – recording (all), mixing (5)
- Channie's "Room" – recording (1–2, 6–8)
- Jisang's Studio – recording (5)
- MadMiix – mixing (1, 3, 5–6, 8–10)
- Larrabee Studios – mixing (2)
- GLAB studio – mixing (7), mix engineering (7)
- 821 Sound Mastering – mastering (1, 3–10)
- The Mastering Palace – mastering (2)

== Charts ==
=== Weekly charts ===
Weekly chart performance
Chart (2024)	Peak position
Japanese Albums (Oricon)	1
Japanese Combined Albums (Oricon)	1
Japanese Hot Albums (Billboard Japan)	1
UK Album Downloads (OCC)	19

=== Monthly charts ===
Monthly chart performance
Chart (2024)	Position
Japanese Albums (Oricon)	1

=== Year-end charts ===
Year-end chart performance
Chart (2024)	Position
Japanese Albums (Oricon)	6
Japanese Combined Albums (Oricon)	8
Japanese Hot Albums (Billboard Japan)	7

Year-end chart performance
Chart (2025)	Position
Japanese Albums (Oricon)	94
Japanese Top Albums Sales (Billboard Japan)	44

== Certifications ==
Certifications
Region	Certification	Certified units/sales
Japan (RIAJ) Physical	2× Platinum	500,000^{^}
^{^} Shipments figures based on certification alone.

== Release history ==
Release dates and formats
Region	Date	Format	Version	Label	Ref.
Japan	November 13, 2024	CD + Blu-ray	Limited A	Epic Japan	
Japan	November 13, 2024	CD	Limited B; standard; FC limited	Epic Japan	
Various	November 13, 2024	Digital download; streaming	Standard	Epic Japan	
South Korea	November 13, 2024	Digital download; streaming	Standard	JYP	

== See also ==
- List of Billboard Japan Hot Albums number ones of 2024
- List of Oricon number-one albums of 2024
