= Why? (Stray Kids song) =

Promotional single by Stray Kids

from the album Giant
- Language: Japanese; English
- Released: April 12, 2024
- Studio: JYPE (Seoul); Jisang's (Seoul)
- Genre: Rock
- Length: 3:48
- Label: Epic Japan
- Composers: Bang Chan; Changbin; Han; Hong Ji-sang
- Lyricists: Bang Chan; Changbin; Han; D&H; Yohei

"Why?" is a song by South Korean boy band Stray Kids from their second Japanese-language studio album Giant (2024). It was released as a promotional single through Epic Records Japan on April 12, 2024. The song serves as the theme for Japanese television drama Re: Revenge – Yokubo no Hate ni (2024).

== Background and composition ==
On March 23, 2024, the second teaser of Japanese television drama Re: Revenge – Yokubo no Hate ni was revealed, alongside an announcement that Stray Kids would perform the theme of the drama, titled "Why?", making it the group's first Japanese drama series theme. The song became available for digital download and streaming platforms on April 12, after the first episode's premiere, and later was included on the group's second Japanese-language studio album Giant (2024).

"Why?" was written by Stray Kids' in-house production team 3Racha, consisting of members Bang Chan, Changbin, and Han, alongside D&H (Purple Night) and Yohei for Japanese lyrics, and Hong Ji-sang for composition and arrangement. A rock track with the image of "dystopia", the song expresses the feelings of moving forward to a goal without worrying about one's surroundings despite encountering obstacles.

== Live performances ==
Stray Kids debuted the performance of "Why?" at the group's fanmeeting SKZ Toy World in April 2024 at Kyocera Dome, Osaka and Belluna Dome, Saitama.

== Credits and personnel ==
Personnel

- Stray Kids – lead vocals, background vocals
  - Bang Chan (3Racha) – lyrics, composition
  - Changbin (3Racha) – lyrics, composition
  - Han (3Racha) – lyrics, composition
- D&H (Purple Night) – Japanese lyrics
- Yohei – Japanese lyrics
- Hong Ji-sang – composition, arrangement, computer programming, electric guitar, keyboards, vocal direction, recording
- Goo Hye-jin – recording
- Lee Tae-sub – mixing
- Kwon Nam-woo – mastering

Locations

- Sony Music Entertainment (Japan) Inc. – publishing
- JYP Publishing (KOMCA) – publishing
- JYPE Studios – recording, mixing
- Jisang's Studio – recording
- 821 Sound Mastering – mastering

== Charts ==
Chart performance for "Why?"
Chart (2024)	Peak position
Japan (Japan Hot 100)	25
Japan Combined Singles (Oricon)	26
New Zealand Hot Singles (RMNZ)	39
US World Digital Song Sales (Billboard)	2

== Release history ==
Release dates and formats for "Why?"
Region	Date	Format	Label	Ref.
Various	April 12, 2024	Digital download; streaming	Epic Japan	
South Korea	April 12, 2024	Digital download; streaming	JYP	
