= All In (EP) =

- Regular edition and digital cover

EP by Stray Kids
- Released: November 4, 2020
- Studios: JYPE (Seoul); W Sound (Seoul)
- Length: 21:20
- Languages: Japanese; English
- Label: Epic Japan
- Producers: 3Racha; J.Y. Park "The Asiansoul"; Lee Hae-sol; Versachoi; Lee Jun-seok; HotSauce; Armadillo; Rangga; Gwon Yeong-chan

Stray Kids chronology
In Life (2020)	All In (2020)	Noeasy (2021)

Singles from All In
- 1. "Top (Japanese ver.)" Released: June 3, 2020; 2. "God's Menu (Japanese ver.)" Released: October 7, 2020; 3. "Back Door (Japanese ver.)" Released: October 13, 2020; 4. "All In" Released: October 20, 2020

All In (stylized in all caps) is the first Japanese extended play (eighth overall) by South Korean boy group Stray Kids. It was released on October 27, 2020, digitally and November 4 physically. The lead single "All In" was released on October 20. This EP also includes the Japanese versions of "God's Menu", and "Back Door". and previous released single, "Top".

== Release ==
This extended play was released in four versions: first press limited edition A, first press limited edition B, first press limited edition C, and a regular edition.

== Commercial performance ==
All In reached number-two on the weekly Oricon Albums Chart with 48,916 copies sold, and number-two on the Billboard Japan Hot Albums Chart.

== Track listing ==
All In track listing
No.	Title	Lyrics	Music	Arrangement	Length
1.	"All In"	J.Y. Park "The Asiansoul"; Bang Chan (3Racha); Changbin (3Racha); Han (3Racha); KM-Markit	J.Y. Park; Bang Chan; Changbin; Han	J.Y. Park; Lee Hae-sol	3:07
2.	"Fam"	Bang Chan; Changbin; Han; KM-Markit	Bang Chan; Changbin; Han; Versachoi	Bang Chan; Versachoi	3:35
3.	"One Day"	Changbin; Lee Jun-seok; KM-Markit	Changbin; Bang Chan; Lee Jun-seok	Bang Chan; Lee Jun-seok	3:13
4.	"God's Menu" (神メニュー)	Bang Chan; Changbin; Han; KM-Markit	Bang Chan; Changbin; Han; Versachoi	Versachoi	3:59
5.	"Back Door" (Japanese version)	Bang Chan; Changbin; Han; KM-Markit	Bang Chan; Changbin; Han; HotSauce	HotSauce; Bang Chan	3:11
6.	"Top" (Japanese version)	Armadillo; Bang Chan; Changbin; Han; KM-Markit	Armadillo; Bang Chan; Changbin; Han; Rangga; Gwon Yeong-chan	Armadillo; Bang Chan; Rangga; Gwon Yeong-chan	3:08
7.	"Slump" (Japanese version)	Han; KM-Markit	Han; Bang Chan	Bang Chan	2:16
Total length:					21:20

DVD bonus track – First Press Limited edition A
No.	Title	Length
1.	"Jacket Shooting Making Movie"
2.	""All In" Music Video Making Movie" (Relay Cam version)

DVD bonus track – First Press Limited edition B
No.	Title	Director(s)	Length
1.	""Gods Menu" (Japanese ver.) Music Video"	Bang Jae-yeob
2.	""Gods Menu" (Japanese ver.) Music Video Making Movie"
3.	""Top" (Japanese ver.) Music Video"	Oui Kim (OUI)
4.	""Top" (Japanese ver.) Music Video Making Movie"

Notes

- "All In", "Fam", "Top", and "Slump" are stylized in all caps.
- Track 4 "神メニュー" is pronounced as Kami Me'nyū.

== Charts ==
=== Weekly charts ===
Chart (2020)	Peak position
Japanese Albums (Oricon)	2
Japan Hot Albums (Billboard Japan)	2

=== Year-end charts ===
Chart (2020)	Position
Japanese Albums (Oricon)	64
Japan Hot Albums (Billboard Japan)	65

== Certifications ==
Certifications for All In
Region	Certification	Certified units/sales
Japan (RIAJ)	Gold	100,000^{^}
^{^} Shipments figures based on certification alone.

== Release history ==
Release history and formats for All In
Country	Date	Format	Label
South Korea	October 27, 2020	Digital download; streaming	JYP
Various	October 27, 2020	Digital download; streaming	Epic Japan
Japan	November 4, 2020	CD; CD+DVD	Epic Japan
