= Top (Stray Kids song) =

2020 single by Stray Kids

- Korean version and Japanese First Press Limited B cover

Single by Stray Kids

from the album Go Live and the EP All In
- Language: Korean; English; Japanese
- B-side: "Slump"
- Released: April 29, 2020
- Studio: W Sound
- Genre: Pop rock; EDM; anisong
- Length: 3:05
- Label: JYP; Epic Japan (Japan)
- Composers: Armadillo; Bang Chan; Changbin; Han; Rangga; Gwon Yeong-chan
- Lyricists: Armadillo; Bang Chan; Changbin; Han; KM-Markit (Japanese); Sophia Pae (English)

Stray Kids singles chronology
"Mixtape: On Track" (2020)	"Top" (2020)	"God's Menu" (2020)

Music videos
- "Top" (Korean version) on YouTube "Top" (Japanese version) on YouTube

"Top" (stylized in all caps) is a song recorded by South Korean boy band Stray Kids. It was released in three languages. The Korean version and English version were released digitally on May 3 and 20, 2020, respectively, through JYP Entertainment, and distributed by Dreamus. The Japanese version was released on June 3, as their first Japanese single, titled "Top -Japanese ver.-", through Epic Records Japan. The song was featured as an opening theme song for the anime television series Kami no Tō -Tower of God-, together with its B-side "Slump", as an ending theme song.

The song debuted atop the Oricon Singles Chart with 37,000 copies and topped at number eight on the Billboard Japan Hot 100. The song also received a gold certification from the Recording Industry Association of Japan.

== Release and promotion ==
On March 25, 2020, "Top" appeared for the first time on the promotional opening video for the anime television series Kami no Tō -Tower of God-. The Japanese version was announced to be released on June 3 under title "Top -Japanese ver.-", in 5 physical-format editions: First Press Limited edition A, First Press Limited edition B, Production Limited edition (anime), Regular edition, and Complete Limited edition (cassette). The stand-alone single version of "Top" and "Slump" were released on April 28 and May 6, respectively, and released officially digitally on May 26.

The Korean and English versions of "Top" were announced on May 11, 2020. The Korean version was released on May 13, 2020 and the English on May 20, 2020 to digital and streaming platform only. The Korean version of "Top" and "Slump" were later included on Stray Kids' first studio album Go Live, while the Japanese versions were included on their first Japanese extended play, All In.

The Korean version of "Top" was performed along with the lead single from Go Live, "God's Menu" on Mnet's M Countdown and MBC's Show! Music Core on June 18 and 20, respectively. The Japanese version of "Slump" was performed for the first time on the YouTube program channel The First Take on June 26, made Stray Kids the first foreign singer to appear in the program.

== Lyrics and composition ==
"Top" is a pop rock and EDM song written by the group's producer 3Racha (Bang Chan, Changbin, Han) and Armadillo, and co-composed with Rangga and Gwon Yeong-chan. The Japanese version added KM-Markit to write the Japanese lyrics. The English version's lyrics were adapted by Bang Chan and Sophia Pae. The song expresses the powerful melody, full of fighting spirit lyrics and magnificent worldview of the anime, and composed in the key of B minor, 98 beats per minute with a running time of 3 minutes and 5 seconds or 3 minutes and 8 seconds for the Japanese version.

The B-side "Slump" is a rock song written by Han from 3Racha and co-composed with Bang Chan. The Japanese version added KM-Markit to write the Japanese lyrics. The English version's lyrics were adapted by Bang Chan and Sophia Pae. The song describes inner anxiety and weak emotions, and composed in the key of G major, 160 beats per minute with a running time of 2 minutes and 14 seconds or 2 minutes and 17 seconds for the Japanese version.

== Commercial performance ==
The Japanese version of "Top" debuted number one on the Oricon Singles Chart for the chart issue date of June 15, 2020, selling 37,157 copies, made Stray Kids the fourth foreign male artist to debut at number one with the first single in history, after Jang Keun-suk ("Let Me Cry"), Exo ("Love Me Right (Romantic Universe)"), and iKon ("Dumb & Dumber").

On Billboard Japan Hot 100, "Top" debuted at number 78. In its second week dated June 15, 2020, the song jumped to number 8 due to releasing a physical format. The song also peaked at number two on the Hot Animation, and number one on the Top Singles Sales, selling 49,329 copies. On the Billboard's World Digital Song Sales, "Top" charted and peaked at number 10, and "Slump" peaked at number 17.

On April 10, 2021, "Top" (Japanese version) received a gold certification from the Recording Industry Association of Japan (RIAJ), denoting shipments of 100,000 copies, making Stray Kids' first Japanese release achieve it.

== Music video ==
The music video "Top" Japanese version was premiered on May 26, 2020, directed by Oui Kim. The music video shows the members in action scenes, seems to have expressed a song image with Stray Kids' own strong intention to go for the top. The Korean version music video was uploaded on June 10, as a "unveil: track" of their debut studio album Go Live.

The music video "Slump" in Japanese version was uploaded on May 11, 2020. It shows recording scenes alternate with anime scenes from Kami no Tō -Tower of God-.

== Track listing ==
- Digital download / streaming – Korean version
1. "Top" (Tower of God OP) – 3:05
2. "Slump" (Tower of God ED) – 2:14
- Digital download / streaming – English version
1. "Top" (English version) – 3:05
2. "Slump" (English version) – 2:14
- CD single / cassette / digital download / streaming – Japanese version (except production limited edition)
1. "Top" (Japanese version) – 3:08
2. "Slump" (Japanese version) – 2:17
3. "Top" (instrumental) – 3:08 (Note: Does not appear on the first press limited edition B)
4. "Slump" (instrumental) – 2:17 (Note: Does not appear on the first press limited edition A)
- CD single – Japanese version (production limited edition)
1. "Top" (Japanese version) – 3:08
2. "Slump" (Japanese version) – 2:17
3. "Top" (Japanese version; Kami no Tō -Tower of God- version) – 1:31
4. "Slump" (Japanese version; Kami no Tō -Tower of God- version) – 1:29
- DVD – Japanese version (first press limited A)
1. "2019.12.1 "Tokyo" Behind the Scenes Video"
2. "2019.12.2 SKZ2020 Jacket Making of Video"
3. "2019.12.2–3 Stray Kids Japan Showcase 2019 "Hi-Stay" Documentary"
4. "2020.3.19 "Top (Japanese ver.)" Jacket Making of Video"

== Credits and personnel ==
Credits adapted from Melon.

Recording and management

- Recorded at W Sound
- Mixed at JYPE Studios ("Top") and Glab Studios ("Slump")
- Mastered at 821 Sound

Personnel

"Top"

- Stray Kids – lead vocals
  - Bang Chan (3Racha) – lyrics, composition, arrangement, computer programming, background vocals
  - Changbin (3Racha) – lyrics, composition, background vocals
  - Han (3Racha) – lyrics, composition, background vocals
- Armadillo – lyrics, composition, arrangement, computer programming, piano
- Rangga – composition, arrangement, computer programming
- Gwon Yeong-chan – composition, arrangement
- KM-Markit – Japanese lyrics
- Sophia Pae – English lyrics
- PLZY – background vocals
- Jung Yu-ra – digital editing
- Ejo IM – recording
- Lee Tae-sub – mixing
- Kwon Nam-woo – mastering

"Slump"

- Stray Kids – lead vocals
  - Han (3Racha) – lyrics, composition, background vocals
  - Bang Chan (3Racha) – composition, arrangement, computer programming, background vocals
- KM-Markit – Japanese lyrics
- Sophia Pae – English lyrics
- Seoko IM – digital editing, recording
- Ejo IM – recording
- Shin Bong-won – mixing
- Kwon Nam-woo – mastering

== Charts ==
=== Weekly charts ===
Chart performance for "Top"
Chart (2020)	Peak position
Japan (Oricon)	1
Japan Hot 100 (Billboard)	8
Japan Hot Animation (Billboard Japan)	2
US World Digital Song Sales (Billboard)	10

Chart performance for "Slump"
Chart (2020)	Peak position
US World Digital Song Sales (Billboard)	17

=== Monthly charts ===
Monthly chart performance for "Top"
Chart (2020)	Peak position
Japan (Oricon)	5

=== Year-end charts ===
Year-end chart performance for "Top"
Chart (2020)	Peak position
Japan Top Singles Sales (Billboard Japan)	64
Japan (Oricon)	68

== Accolades ==
Year-end lists
Critic/Publication	List	Work	Rank	Ref.
Spotify	Anime Now's Best Anime Songs of 2020	"Slump" (Japanese version)	42	
The Honey Pop	22 English K-pop Songs to Help Ease You into the Genre	"Slump" (English version)	Placed	

== Certifications ==
Certifications for "Top"
Region	Certification	Certified units/sales
Japan (RIAJ)	Gold	100,000^{^}
^{^} Shipments figures based on certification alone.

== Release history ==
Release history and formats for "Top"
Region	Date	Format	Version	Label	Ref.
Various	April 29, 2020	Digital download; streaming	Japanese	Epic Japan	
Various	May 13, 2020	Digital download; streaming	Korean	JYP	
Various	May 20, 2020	Digital download; streaming	English	JYP	
Various	May 26, 2020	Digital download; streaming	Japanese	Epic Japan	
South Korea	May 26, 2020	Digital download; streaming	Japanese	JYP	
Japan	June 3, 2020	CD+DVD	First Press Limited A (Japanese)	Epic Japan	
Japan	June 3, 2020	CD+SpecialZine	First Press Limited B (Japanese)	Epic Japan	
Japan	June 3, 2020	CD	Production Limited (Anime) (Japanese)	Epic Japan	
Japan	June 3, 2020	CD	Regular (Japanese)	Epic Japan	
Japan	June 3, 2020	Cassette tape	Complete Limited (Japanese)	Epic Japan	

== See also ==
- List of Oricon number-one singles of 2020
