= Changbin =

South Korean rapper (born 1999)

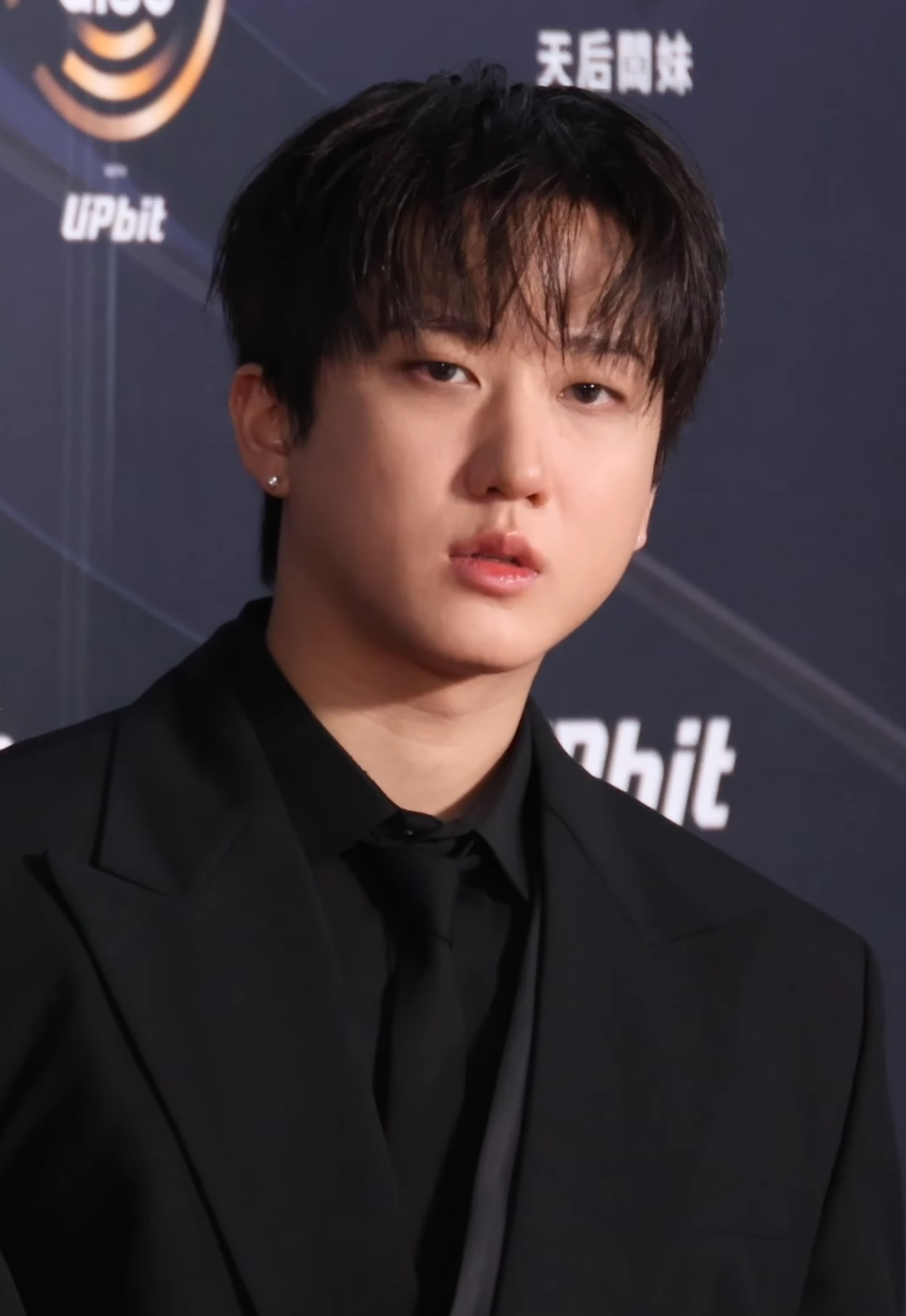
- Changbin in September 2026
- Born: Seo Chang-bin; August 11, 1999 (age 27); Yongin, Gyeonggi Province, South Korea
- Other name: SpearB (Note: Used when released 3Racha underground rapper songs in 2017)
- Occupations: Rapper; singer; songwriter; record producer; composer
- Years active: 2017–present
- Works: Songs written
- Musical career
- Genres: K-pop; hip hop; electronica
- Instrument: Vocals
- Label: JYP
- Member of: Stray Kids; 3Racha

Korean name
- Hangul: 서창빈
- RR: Seo Changbin
- MR: Sŏ Ch'angbin

Signature
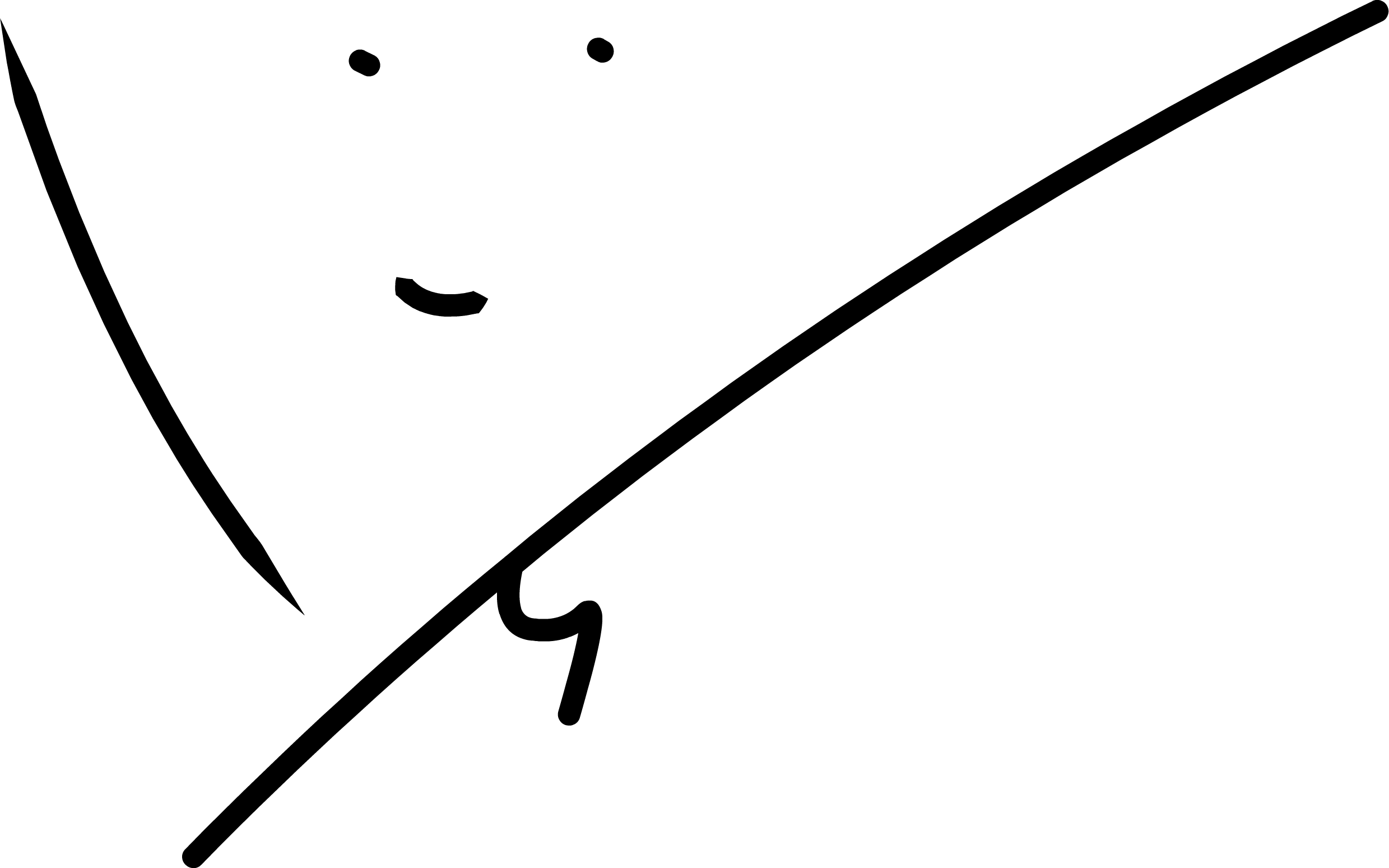

Seo Chang-bin (Korean: 서창빈; born August 11, 1999), known mononymously as Changbin, is a South Korean rapper, singer, songwriter, and record producer. He is a member of the South Korean boy group Stray Kids, formed by JYP Entertainment in 2017. He is also a member of 3Racha, an in-house production team and sub-unit of Stray Kids.

Besides his contributions to Stray Kids, Changbin participated as a contestant in Show Me the Money 9 and has collaborated with various artists, including Yoon Ji-sung, Thai rappers F.Hero and Milli. Changbin became a full member of the Korea Music Copyright Association in February 2023.

== Early life and education ==
Seo Chang-bin was born on August 11, 1999, in Yongin, South Korea. He graduated from Bora High School and studied at Gukje Cyber University in the Department of Entertainment.

== Career ==
=== Pre-debut: 3Racha and Stray Kids reality ===
Changbin joined JYP Entertainment through an audition where he danced to a self-produced song. During his trainee period, Changbin teamed up with fellow JYP trainees Bang Chan and Han to form the underground rap group 3Racha, releasing multiple mixtapes under the pseudonym SpearB, without the company's knowledge. They uploaded their first mixtape, J:/2017/mixtape, consisting of seven tracks, to SoundCloud.

In 2017, Changbin participated in JYP's survival show Stray Kids and was confirmed to debut with eight other contestants. Throughout the show, he demonstrated his rapping and music composition skills, with several of his written songs included in the pre-debut EP Mixtape.

=== 2018-present: Stray Kids and collaborations ===
Changbin officially debuted with Stray Kids through a debut showcase and the EP I Am Not on March 25, 2018. He participated in the composing and writing for the songs in the EP.

In February 2019, Changbin featured on "You... Like the Wind", a side track from Yoon Ji-sung's debut album. In 2020, Changbin participated as a contestant in Show Me the Money 9. He passed the 1st Round but eliminated in the 60 Seconds Team Trial. He went viral for his Jutdae (Korean: 줏대; lit. 'principles; strong spine; backbone') meme, which featured in an advertisement of Samsung Galaxy three years later.

On October 28, 2021, Changbin featured on the song "Mirror Mirror" by Thai rappers F.Hero and Milli. The song won Best Collaboration awards from Thailand's Toty Music Awards and The Guitar Mag Awards.

In February 2023, Changbin, along with his fellow 3Racha members Bang Chan and Han, was promoted to regular membership in KOMCA and, as of August 2026, has credits for 207 songs, the sixth most among K-pop idols.

On October 15, 2024, Changbin was featured on the song "VAY" from Itzy's ninth EP Gold, for which he also wrote the lyrics and composed the music. In September 2025, he featured on "R&B Me" by Jun. K from the EP Dear My Muse.

== Other ventures ==
=== Fashion ===
In May 2024, he made his Met Gala debut with Stray Kids as the guest of Tommy Hilfiger. On February 26, 2026, footwear brand Autry announced Changbin as its inaugural brand ambassador.

=== Philanthropy ===
On February 16, 2023, Changbin donated ₩100 million (equivalent to ₩100 million or US$78,000 in 2025) through the international relief organization The Promise to aid the relief efforts following the earthquake in Turkey and Syria. His contributions led to his appointment as a member of the Honors Club on March 30.

Changbin donated another ₩100 million (equivalent to ₩100 million or US$78,000 in 2025) to Samsung Medical Center on August 11, 2025 to celebrate his 26th birthday. The donation he made will be used to cover the treatment costs of children and adolescent patients receiving treatment at Samsung Medical Center, as well as emotional support activities to help them achieve psychological stability.

On August 11, 2026, Changbin donated ₩100 million again to Samsung Medical Center in celebration of his 27th birthday, with the donation allocated to treatment costs for pediatric and adolescent patients and emotional support programs for their families.

=== Endorsements ===
On September 1, 2023, Changbin released a single titled "Fly High" for the promotion of Samsung Galaxy Z Flip 5. On February 5, 2024, he featured in the release of another promotional single, Kim Chang-wan's "8th Grader (Respect Your Dreams)", for Samsung Galaxy S24.

== Discography ==
=== Songs ===
==== As lead artist ====
List of songs, showing year released, selected chart positions, and name of the album
Title	Year	Peak chart positions				Album
Title	Year	KOR DL	NZ Hot	UK Sales	US World	Album
"We Go" (with Bang Chan and Han)	2020	—	—	—	10	In Life
"Surfin'" (with Lee Know and Felix)	2021	29	—	—	—	Noeasy
"Piece of a Puzzle" (조각) (with Seungmin)	2021	—	—	—	—	SKZ-Replay
"Doodle"	2022	—	—	—	—	SKZ-Replay
"Streetlight" (feat. Bang Chan)	2022	—	—	—	—	SKZ-Replay
"Up All Night" (오늘 밤 나는 불을 켜) (with Bang Chan, Felix and Seungmin)	2022	—	—	—	—	SKZ-Replay
"Zone" (with Bang Chan and Han)	2022	—	—	—	—	SKZ-Replay
"Because" (좋으니까) (with Felix)	2022	—	—	—	—	SKZ-Replay
"Muddy Water" (with Felix, Hyunjin, and Han)	2022	26	—	—	—	Oddinary
"3Racha" (with Bang Chan and Han)	2022	36	24	—	13	Maxident
"Heyday" (as 3Racha with Bang Chan and Han)	2022	118	—	—	13	Street Man Fighter Original Vol.4 Crew Songs
"Snain" (비바람) (with Felix and Seungmin)	2023	—	—	—	—	Non-album single (Note: Released only on YouTube as part of SKZ-Record project.)
"Ultra"	2024	31	—	—	—	Hop
"Burnin' Tires" (with I.N)	2025	160	36	41	3	Mixtape: Dominate
"My Name" (명)	2026	—	—	—	—	SKZ-Replay 2026 Pt.1
"—" denotes releases that did not chart or were not released in that region.

==== As featured artist ====
List of songs, showing year released, selected chart positions, and name of the album
Title	Year	Peak chart positions					Album
Title	Year	KOR	HUN	JPN Cmb.	JPN Hot	US World	Album
"My Universe" (Seungmin and I.N featuring Changbin)	2020	—	—	—	—	21	In Life
"Mirror Mirror" (F.Hero & Milli featuring Changbin)	2021	—	—	—	—	19	Non-album single
"Just Breathe" (Sky-Hi, featuring 3Racha)	2022	—	15	50	50	11	The Debut
"Maknae on Top" (막내온탑) (I.N featuring Bang Chan and Changbin)	2022	—	—	—	—	—	SKZ-Replay
"Vay" (Itzy featuring Changbin)	2024	— (Note: "Vay" did not chart on the Circle Digital Chart but peaked at number 67 on the Download Chart.)	—	—	—	—	Gold
"R&B Me" (Jun. K featuring Changbin)	2025	— (Note: "R&B Me" did not chart on the Circle Digital Chart but peaked at number 133 on the Download Chart, and number 85 on the BGM Chart.)	—	—	—	—	Dear My Muse
"—" denotes releases that did not chart or were not released in that region.

=== Promotional singles ===
List of promotional singles, showing year released, and selected chart positions
Title	Year	Peak	Album
Title	Year	KOR	Album
"Fly High"	2023	— (Note: "Fly High" did not enter the Circle Digital Chart, but peaked at number 173 on the component BGM Chart.)	Non-album promotional single
"8th Grader (Respect Your Dreams)" (with Kim Chang-wan)	2024	—	Non-album promotional single
"—" denotes releases that did not chart or were not released in that region.

== Videography ==
=== Music videos ===
List of music videos, showing year released, artist and name of the album
Title	Year	Artist(s)	Album	Ref.
"Ultra"	2024	Changbin	Hop	

== Filmography ==
Year	Title	Role	Notes	Ref.
2017	Stray Kids	Contestant	Debuted with Stray Kids	
2020	King of Mask Singer	Contestant	As "Private Second Class" in Episode 261	
2020	Show Me the Money 9	Contestant	Eliminated in 60 Second Team Trials	

== Awards and nominations ==
Award ceremony	Year	Category	Nominee / work(s)	Result	Ref.
Toty Music Awards	2021	Popular Collaboration/Collaboration Artist Songs	"Mirror Mirror"	Won (Note: Shared with F.Hero and Milli)	
The Guitar Mag Awards	2022	Best Collaboration of the Year	"Mirror Mirror"	Won	
