= Christmas EveL =

2021 single album by Stray Kids

- Digital cover

Single album by Stray Kids
- Released: November 29, 2021
- Studios: JYPE (Seoul); Channie's "Room" (Seoul)
- Genres: Christmas; hip hop; pop
- Length: 13:50
- Languages: Korean; English
- Label: JYP
- Producers: 3Racha; HotSauce; Nickko Young; Earattack; Versachoi

Stray Kids chronology
Noeasy (2021)	Christmas EveL (2021)	SKZ2021 (2021)

Singles from Christmas EveL
- 1. "Christmas EveL" Released: November 29, 2021; 2. "Winter Falls" Released: November 29, 2021

Christmas EveL (pronounced "Christmas Evil") is a single album (Note: JYP Entertainment officially classified Christmas EveL as a single, but serves both "Christmas EveL" and "Winter Falls" as the dual lead single. Different sources described Christmas EveL as a single album or an EP.) by South Korean boy band Stray Kids. It was released on November 29, 2021, through JYP Entertainment, and distributed by Dreamus, as part of the band's Season Song project. Marketed as a "holiday special single", it consists of four tracks, including the dual lead singles "Christmas EveL", and "Winter Falls", with a theme of "Christmas naughty boy" and a Christmas, hip hop, and pop sound. Commercially, the single album debuted atop the Gaon Album Chart, was certified triple platinum by Korea Music Content Association (KMCA), selling 750,000 copies, and was nominated for Album of the Year – 4th Quarter at the 11th Gaon Chart Music Awards.

== Background ==
On January 1, 2021, New Year's Day, Stray Kids released the video Step Out 2021, consisting of the group's achievements in 2020, and 2021's to-do plan, including their project called Season Song. In 2021, the group made history after participating and won the Mnet competitive reality television show Kingdom: Legendary War, and releasing their second studio album Noeasy on August 23 with the lead single "Thunderous", which received an important musical success. The album debuted atop the Gaon Album Chart and sold over 1.2 million copies, becoming the first million-selling album by the group and their label JYP Entertainment. On November 11, the group released a mysterious poster to promote Christmas EveL. The project was later described as a "holiday special single" for their fans as a thank-you gift, as part of the Season Song project.

== Music and lyrics ==
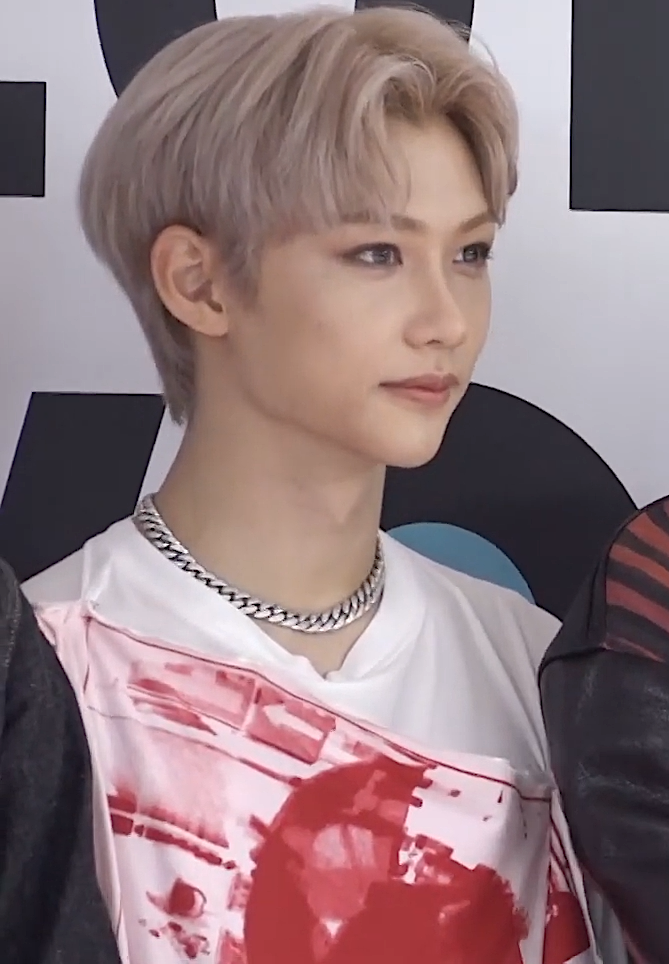
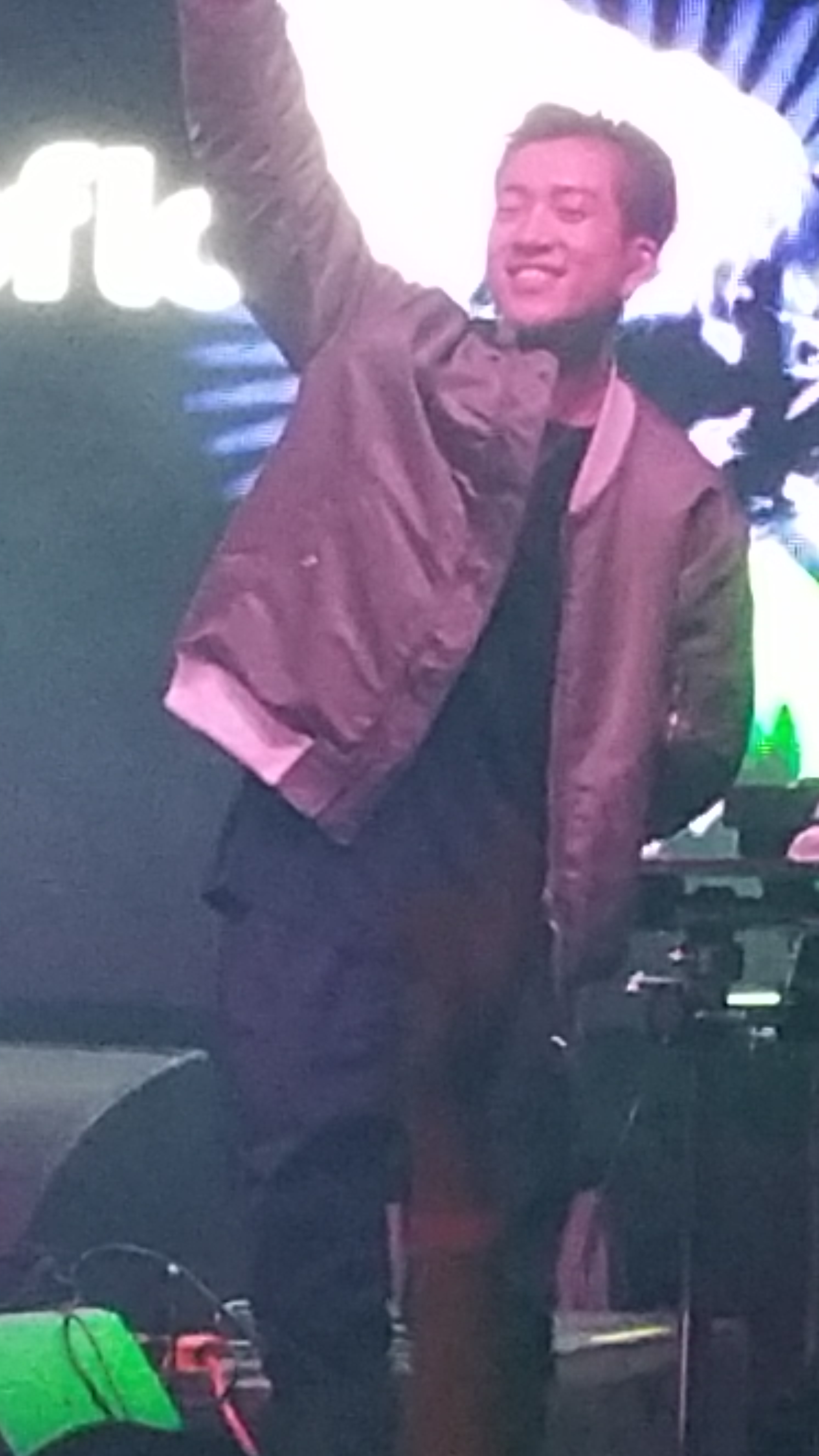
Stray Kids member Felix (left) and Korean-American rapper Junoflo (right) co-wrote the English lyrics of "Domino"

Christmas EveL is thirteen minutes and fifty seconds long, consisting of four tracks, categorized as a Christmas, hip hop and pop record with the theme "Christmas naughty boy". All tracks were produced and written by 3Racha, an in-house production team of Stray Kids, consisting of Bang Chan, Changbin, and Han. The group's member Felix and Korean American rapper Junoflo co-wrote the English lyrics of "Domino", originally included on the group's second studio album, Noeasy, with the original writer, Bang Chan. HotSauce, Nickko Young, Earattack, and Versachoi also participated in co-composing the tracks.

Christmas EveL opens with the title track, "Christmas EveL", a funky hip hop song, expressing the different points of view and downsides of Christmas, rather than romance and warmth. Elite Daily described the title track as an "anti-Christmas song". The Christmas-themed ballad second track, "24 to 25", is about wanting to spend time together from December 24 to 25, especially with their fans, called Stay, driven by a "calm" guitar sound. "Winter Falls", the third ballad pop track, details a person who tries to erase the complicated thoughts about a former relationship that come to mind during winter and the end of the year.

== Release and promotion ==
On November 11, 2021, Stray Kids dropped a mysterious poster, titled Christmas EveL without knowing the format. The poster features a horrible, slightly off-smiley face in black, and a blood-like red background, showing 2 torn papers, the one features the red-font "Christmas Eve", and the one writes the "L" in flowing ink, as well as a release date: 2021.11.29. Marketed as the group's "holiday special single", previewing and pre-orders for the limited version of the CD began on the same day, and the standard version began on November 15. The group announced that they would not promote the songs on any music program, as a gift to their fans who have sent warm support and love in 2021.

The individual and group teaser photos were uploaded in two sets. The first shows the members in tartan-patterned outfits in an arcade. The second expresses the members tying a bow on their necks and wearing Christmas-themed outfits, surrounded by wrapped presents and a Christmas tree in the background. The official track listing was posted on November 19, serving "Christmas EveL" and "Winter Falls" as a double lead single on the record. Two music video teasers of "Christmas EveL" were released on November 20 and 27, while "Winter Falls" was released on November 22 and 28. A snippet video called "unveil: track" of "24 to 25" was uploaded on November 25, as well as the title track "Christmas EveL" via Instagram Reels on November 27. An accompanying music video for "Christmas EveL" was premiered alongside the single album release, "Winter Falls" the next day, and "24 to 25" on December 6. Although there is no promotion at the music shows, "Winter Falls" was given a debut performance at 2021 SBS Gayo Daejeon on December 25, alongside "Thunderous", arranged in the Christmas version. The next year, they performed "24 to 25", and "Christmas EveL" at its 2022 edition of the same program.

== Critical reception ==
Professional ratings
Review scores
Source	Rating
NME	4/5 stars

Writing for NME, Rhian Daly rated Christmas EveL four out of five stars, and said that aside from the English version of "Domino" that provides a "fiery end to the record", there is a "Christmassy atmosphere that runs neatly through the rest of the tracks". Daly did not see this as a negative though, commenting that "That's typical Stray Kids, though – always keeping us on our toes even when we think we've got them pegged." Christmas EveL was nominated for Album of the Year – 4th Quarter at 11th Gaon Chart Music Awards.

== Commercial performance ==
In South Korea, Christmas EveL debuted at number one on the Gaon Album Chart for the date issue of November 28 – December 4, 2021, selling 654,658 copies as of November 2021, making it the group's sixth number-one album after Clé 1: Miroh, Clé: Levanter, Go Live, In Life, and Noeasy. The lead single "Christmas EveL" and "Winter Falls" entered the Gaon Digital Chart simultaneously at numbers 114 and 151, respectively. All of the single album's four tracks also debuted simultaneously on the Gaon Download Chart, where the lead singles debuted in the top 10. In the United States, the single album landed at number 25 on the Billboard Heatseekers Albums, as well as number 9 on Hungary's Album Top 40 Chart. Christmas EveL received a double platinum certification by Korea Music Content Association (KMCA) on February 10, 2022, and later a triple platinum on May 12.

== Track listing ==
Christmas EveL track listing
No.	Title	Lyrics	Music	Arrangement	Length
1.	"Christmas EveL"	Bang Chan (3Racha); Changbin (3Racha); Han (3Racha)	Bang Chan; Changbin; Han; HotSauce	HotSauce; Bang Chan	2:59
2.	"24 to 25"	Bang Chan	Bang Chan; Nickko Young	Bang Chan; Nickko Young	3:37
3.	"Winter Falls"	Han	Han; Earattack	Earattack	3:35
4.	"Domino" (English version)	Bang Chan^{[a]}; Changbin; Han; Felix^{[a]}; Junoflo^{[a]}	Bang Chan; Changbin; Han; Versachoi	Versachoi; Bang Chan	3:19
Total length:					13:50

Notes

- ^{^[a]} signifies an English lyricist.

== Credits and personnel ==
Credits adapted from the official website.

Musicians

- Stray Kids – lead vocals
  - Bang Chan (3Racha) – lyrics (1, 2, 4), English lyrics (4), composition (1, 2, 4), arrangement (1, 2, 4), all instruments (2, 4)
  - Changbin (3Racha) – lyrics (1, 4), composition (1, 4)
  - Han (3Racha) – background vocals (3), lyrics (1, 3, 4), composition (1, 3, 4)
  - Felix – English lyrics (4)
- HotSauce – composition (1), arrangement (1), keyboard (1), drum programming (1), computer programming (1)
- Nickko Young – composition (2), arrangement (2), all instruments (2)
- Shin Ye-rin – strings (2)
- Earattack – composition (3), arrangement (3), background vocals (3), all instruments (3)
- Kim Jong-sung – guitar (3)
- Junoflo – English lyrics (4)
- Versachoi – composition (4), arrangement (4), all instruments (4)

Technical

- KayOne Lee – digital editing (all)
- Goo Hye-jin – recording (1, 3, 4)
- Choi Hye-jin – recording (2, 3, 4)
- Bang Chan (3Racha) – recording (2)
- Manny Marroquin – mixing (1)
- Jay-P Gu – mixing (2)
- Lee Tae-sub – mixing (3)
- Yoon Won-kwon – mixing (4)
- Chris Galland – mix engineering (1)
  - Zach Pereyra – assistant
  - Anthony Vilchis – assistant
- Kang Sun-young – mix engineering (2)
- Chris Gehringer – mastering (1)
- Kwon Nam-woo – mastering (2, 3, 4)

Locations

- JYP Publishing (KOMCA) – original publishing (all)
- Copyright Control – original publishing (2, 3)
- JYPE Studios – recording (all), mixing (3)
- Channie's "Room" – recording (2)
- Larrabee Studios – mixing (1)
- Klang Studio – mixing (2)
- Studio DDeepKick – mixing (4)
- Sterling Sound – mastering (1)
- 821 Sound Mastering – mastering (2, 3, 4)

== Charts ==
=== Weekly charts ===
Weekly chart performance for Christmas EveL
Chart (2021–2022)	Peak position
Croatian International Albums (HDU)	8
Hungarian Albums (MAHASZ)	5
South Korean Albums (Gaon)	1
UK Physical Singles (OCC)	5
US Heatseekers Albums (Billboard)	25

=== Monthly charts ===
Monthly chart performance for Christmas EveL
Chart (2021)	Peak position
South Korean Albums (Gaon)	1

=== Year-end charts ===
Year-end chart performance for Christmas EveL
Chart (2021)	Position
South Korean Albums (Gaon)	17
Chart (2022)	Position
Hungarian Albums (MAHASZ)	82

== Certifications ==
Certifications for Christmas EveL
Region	Certification	Certified units/sales
South Korea (KMCA)	Million	1,000,000^{^}
^{^} Shipments figures based on certification alone.

== Release history ==
Release dates and formats for Christmas EveL
Region	Date	Format	Version	Label	Ref.
Various	November 29, 2021	Digital download; streaming	—N/a	JYP	
South Korea	November 29, 2021	CD	Limited; standard	JYP	

== See also ==
- List of Gaon Album Chart number ones of 2021
