= Christmas EveL (song) =

2021 single by Stray Kids

Single by Stray Kids

from the EP Christmas EveL
- Language: Korean; English; Spanish
- A-side: "Winter Falls"
- Released: November 29, 2021
- Studio: JYPE, Seoul
- Genre: Hip hop
- Length: 2:59
- Label: JYP
- Composers: Bang Chan; Changbin; Han; HotSauce
- Lyricists: Bang Chan; Changbin; Han

Stray Kids singles chronology
"Scars" (2021)	"Christmas EveL" / "Winter Falls" (2021)	"Maniac" (2022)

Music video
- "Christmas EveL" on YouTube

"Christmas EveL" (pronounced "Christmas evil") is a song recorded by South Korean boy band Stray Kids. It was released on November 29, 2021, as a title track and dual lead single alongside "Winter Falls" from their single album of the same name, through JYP Entertainment and distributed by Dreamus, which marketed as "holiday special single" as part of Season Song project. Written by 3Racha (Bang Chan, Changbin, Han) and HotSauce, the song expresses a different point of view about Christmas, rather than romance and warmth with a funky hip hop sound.

== Background and release ==
On November 11, Stray Kids announce to release the single album Christmas EveL, scheduled for release on November 29, 2021. The official track listing was posted on November 19, serving "Christmas EveL" as a lead single, alongside "Winter Falls". Two music video teasers of "Christmas EveL" were released on November 20, and 27, respectively. "Christmas EveL" was released simultaneously as the single album on November 29. Stray Kids will not promote the song on any music program, as a thank-you gift to their fans.

== Composition and lyrics ==
"Christmas EveL" is a funky hip hop song written by the group's in-house production team 3Racha, consisting of Bang Chan, Changbin, and Han, and co-composed with Hot Sauce in the key of F minor, 140 beats per minute with a running time of 2 minutes and 59 seconds. Lyrically, "Christmas EveL" said about Christmas from a different point of view, Bang Chan said the song "contains our naughty side and energy", while Changbin "wanted to express the reason why naughty boys looked at Christmas differently, rather than a romantic and warm Christmas". Elite Daily described the title track as an "anti-Christmas song", described the downsides of the holiday.

== Commercial performance ==
"Christmas EveL" debuted at number 114 on the South Korean Gaon Digital Chart. The song landed at number 51 on the Billboard Japan Download Songs and number 25 on Singapore's RIAS Top Regional Chart. The song entered the US Billboard World Digital Song Sales at number 10 and Hungary's Singles Top 40 at number 23. "Christmas EveL" debuted at number 197 on the Billboard Global Excl. U.S.

== Music video ==
An accompanying music video of "Christmas EveL" was premiered alongside the single on November 29, 2021, preceded by two teaser videos. The music video surpassed 100 million views on November 5, 2022, becoming Stray Kids' eighth music video to reach this milestone after "God's Menu", "Back Door", "Miroh", "My Pace", "Thunderous", "Maniac", and "Hellevator".

Directed by Lee Hye-sung, the music video begins with Stray Kids in a traffic jam and listening to radio news. The news was presented that Santa Claus lost his voice due to the attack of the "sound monster", who appeared in the Noeasy trailer, and he will hire substitutes, who are Stray Kids, to spread joy to children instead of him. They go to a convenience store to find presents to deliver to the children and make a mess. Later, Bang Chan pressed the button to warp everyone again and left the store. A pink gift box fell from the sky and transformed into a magical pink truck. They threw the gift boxes out of the truck to deliver the children while it was driving. Suddenly, the truck got into an accident and skidded off a cliff to a sink. They crawled out from under the sink and dropped presents under the Christmas tree in the house, but the girl opened the door and saw them by chance. They introduced themself as Stray Kids, but she screamed that "You're not Santa." Later, Stray Kids and the girl played together. It ends with Stray Kids leaving the store and receiving the text to work instead of Santa Claus again.

== Live performances ==
A year after the song release, Stray Kids gave the debut performance of "Christmas EveL" at 2022 2022 SBS Gayo Daejeon on December 24, 2022, alongside "Case 143" and "24 to 25".

== Accolades ==
"Christmas EveL" received one music program award on the December 10, 2021, episode of Music Bank.

== Credits and personnel ==
Credits adapted from the official website.

Locations

- JYP Publishing (KOMCA) – original publishing
- JYPE Studios – recording
- Larrabee Studios – mixing
- Sterling Sound – mastering

Personnel

- Stray Kids – lead vocals
  - Bang Chan (3Racha) – lyrics, composition, arrangement
  - Changbin (3Racha) – lyrics, composition
  - Han (3Racha) – lyrics, composition
- HotSauce – composition, arrangement, keyboard, drum programming, computer programming
- KayOne Lee – digital editing
- Goo Hye-jin – recording
- Manny Marroquin – mixing
- Chris Galland – mix engineering
  - Zach Pereyra – assistant
  - Anthony Vilchis – assistant
- Chris Gehringer – mastering

== Charts ==
=== Weekly charts ===
Chart performance for "Christmas EveL"
Chart (2021)	Peak position
Global Excl. US (Billboard)	197
Hungary (Single Top 40)	23
Japan Download Songs (Billboard Japan)	51
Singapore Top Regional (RIAS)	25
South Korea (Gaon)	114
US World Digital Song Sales (Billboard)	10

=== Monthly charts ===
Monthly chart performance for "Christmas EveL"
Chart (2021)	Position
South Korea Download (Gaon)	59

== Release history ==
Release dates and formats for "Christmas EveL"
Region	Date	Format	Label	Ref.
Various	November 29, 2021	Digital download; streaming	JYP	

== See also ==
- List of Music Bank Chart winners (2021)
