= Noeasy =

- Digital cover

Studio album by Stray Kids
- Released: August 23, 2021
- Studios: JYPE (Seoul); Jisang's (Seoul); Channie's Room (Seoul)
- Genres: Hip hop; EDM; pop; R&B; rock
- Length: 46:35
- Languages: Korean; English
- Label: JYP
- Producers: 3Racha; Versachoi; HotSauce; ByHVN (153/Joombas); Telykast; Millionboy; Hong Ji-sang; JinbyJin; Earattack; DaviDior; Armadillo; Gump; Kobee; Holy M

Stray Kids chronology
All In (2020)	Noeasy (2021)	Christmas EveL (2021)

Singles from Noeasy
- 1. "Thunderous" Released: August 23, 2021

Noeasy is the second studio album by South Korean boy group Stray Kids. It was released on August 23, 2021, through JYP Entertainment, nine months after its predecessor the Japanese-language extended play (EP) All In (2020), and eleven months after the Korean reissue In Life (2020). The album's title is a wordplay on "noisy" and "no easy", and conveys the idea of the group making a loud impact on the world with their music.

For the album, 3Racha (Bang Chan, Changbin, and Han), an in-house production team consisting of members of Stray Kids, worked with songwriters and producers including Versachoi, HotSauce, Hong Ji-sang, Krysta Youngs, and the group's other members. The fourteen-track album spans the musical genres hip hop, EDM, pop, R&B, and rock, and includes the lead single "Thunderous", and earlier releases "Wolfgang" and "Mixtape: Oh".

Upon its release, Noeasy received favorable reviews for its creativity, storytelling, themes, and energy. The album peaked at number one on the Gaon Album Chart, and in the top 20 of album charts in Australia, Austria, Belgium, Denmark, Finland, Hungary, Japan, the Netherlands, Poland, and Switzerland. Over 1.3 million copies of Noeasy were sold in 2021 and the Korea Music Content Association (KMCA) certified it a million-seller, acknowledging it as the first million-selling album for the group and their label. Noeasy won Best Album (Bonsang) at the 36th Golden Disc Awards.

== Background ==
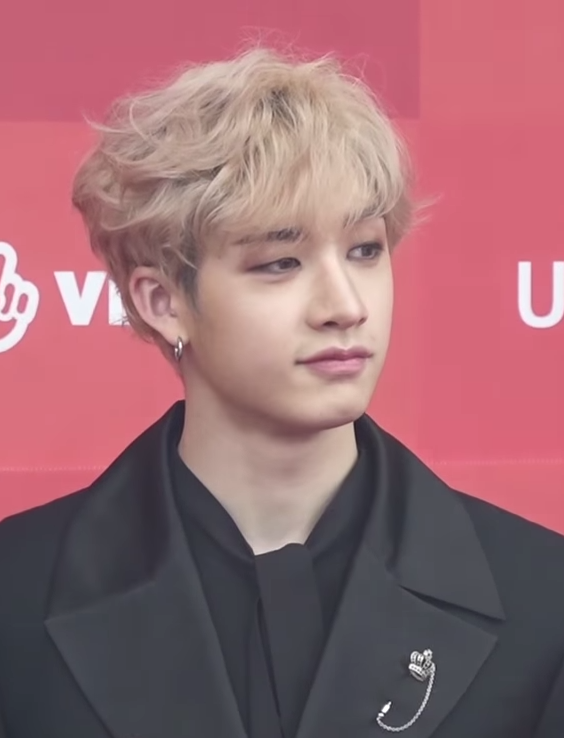
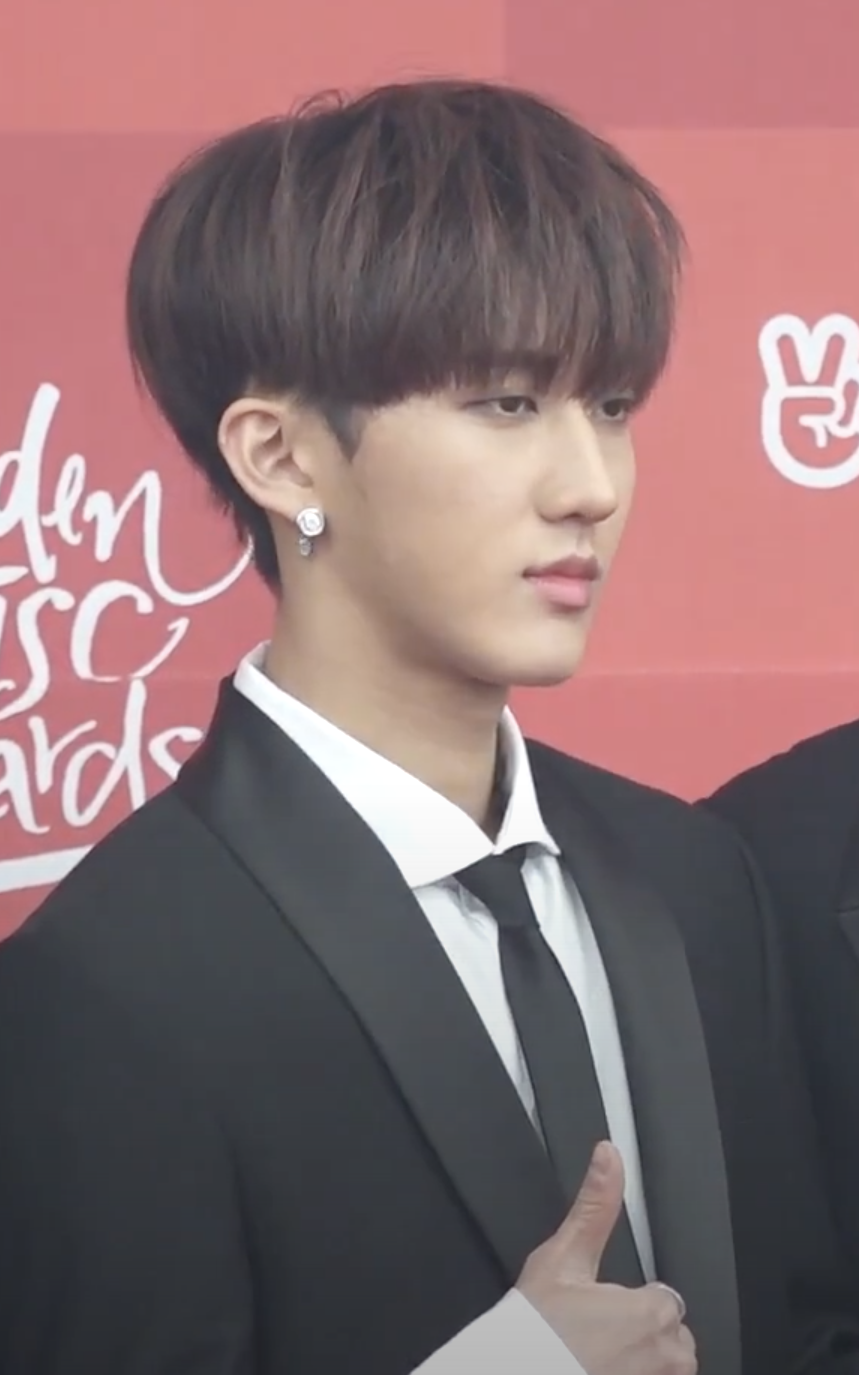
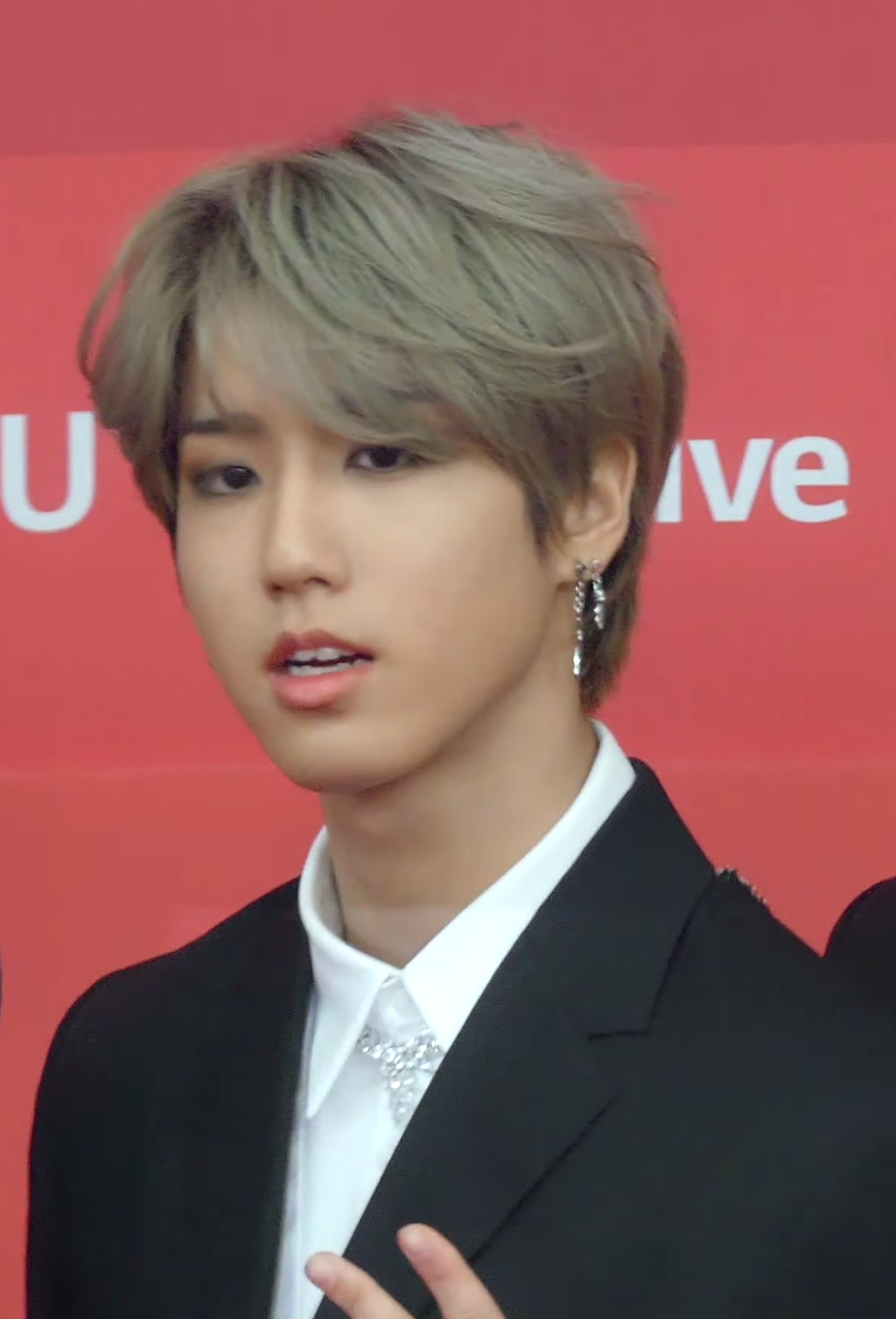
3Racha, consisting of Bang Chan (left), Changbin (center), and Han (right), a production team of Stray Kids, who wrote and produced all the group's release, including Noeasy.

Stray Kids uploaded the video "Step Out 2021", which describes the group's accomplishments in 2020 and plans for 2021—including a second studio album—.through their social media channels on January 1, 2021. Between April and June of that year, the group participated in the Mnet competitive reality television show Kingdom: Legendary War, in which they competed against other similar groups and emerged as the winner. During the program, they released the song "Wolfgang" on May 28, from the extended play (EP) Kingdom <Final: Who Is the King?>, as part of the final performance competition. This was followed by the single "Mixtape: Oh" on June 26 and the announcement Hyunjin would rejoin the group in July following a hiatus since late February.

On June 29, 2021, the South Korean news outlet SpoTV News reported the group would release an album in late August and hold Kingdom Week, a television-program benefit for the winner. Later, JYP Entertainment confirmed the group were preparing a new album but had not decided its format. Hyunjin would also participate in the new album's promotion. A month later, via the album trailer "Thunderous", the group announced their second studio album would be titled Noeasy and was scheduled for release on August 23, 2021, marking their first Korean physical release in 11 months.

Before the album announcement, in early July, Stray Kids released SKZ Camp Song: Howl in Harmony, a five-episode camp-type online program that documents the group's song-creation process and the making of music videos for them. They group were separated into three teams: Quokka Bbang Daengi (Han, Seungmin, I.N; formerly Margarine Bbang) to write the song "Gone Away"; Yeoreum Wangja (Lee Know, Changbin, Felix) for "Surfin'"; and Bekka Wang (Bang Chan, Hyunjin) for "Red Lights". In early April, the group also teased the B-side "Sorry, I Love You" on their V Live's live-streaming content Chan's Room, and "The View" was teased as a title on the music video of "Mixtape: Oh" in late June.

=== Title and concept ===
The album's title, Noeasy, is a wordplay on "noisy"—describing the misconception of the group's music as "noise music"— and "no easy", reflecting the highs and lows of life. According to Bang Chan; "We [Stray Kids] actually thought the term 'noise music' was something that we could use as our own weapon".

Both interpretations express that despite the group's hardships, they aim to be the noisiest group. Bang Chan, the group leader, told several South Korean news outlets; "[Noeasy] means that we want to leave a loud impact on the world with our music". Seungmin said; "the meaning (of Noeasy) is something like, 'life is not easy because of the naggers who tell us to do this and that, but we are Stray Kids, and we are not backing down' ... "

== Music and lyrics ==
Noeasy is forty-six minutes and thirty-five seconds long, and has fourteen tracks of various music genres. The album's first four tracks are described as hip hop and EDM songs with aggressive bass sounds to represent fighting, and to mock the group's critics and haters. Tracks five through nine are "emotional" songs with pop, rock, and R&B sounds. The album concludes with three sub-unit songs and two previously released songs. All of the tracks were produced and mostly written by Bang Chan, Changbin, and Han, who work together as the group's production team 3Racha. Other group members also participated in song writing; Lee Know and Felix co-wrote "Surfin'", Hyunjin co-wrote "Red Lights", and Seungmin and I.N co-wrote "Gone Away". Several other Korean and foreign songwriter-producers, including Versachoi, HotSauce, Hong Ji-sang, and Krysta Youngs, also contributed to the album.

=== Songs ===
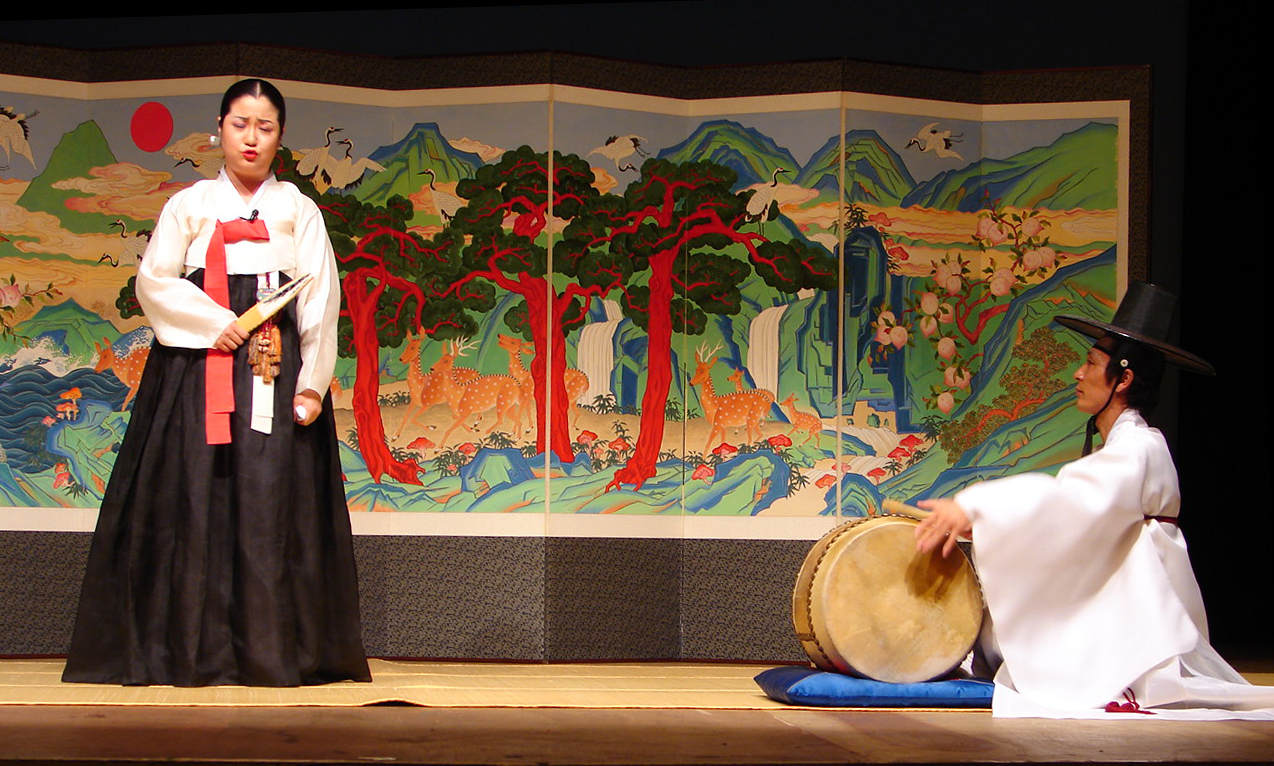
The Korean title of "Thunderous", "Sori-kkun", is inspired by a singer position of pansori (pictured) of the same name.

Noeasy opens with "Cheese", an EDM track with a "strong" rock sound, "cheerful" energy, and "rough" bass synth, which uses the word "cheese" as a wordplay to compare smiling with a variety of cheeses. The lyrics include a flippant response to the group's critics. "Thunderous", the second track and the album's lead single, is a hip-hop and trap song that includes elements of Korean traditional music (gugak), brass instruments, and chuimsae. The song expresses the conviction the group will not be discouraged and will maintain their principles despite criticism. The Korean title "Sori-kkun" (소리꾼) has a dual meaning of jansori-kkun (잔소리꾼) meaning "nagger", and sori-kkun (소리꾼) meaning "(pansori's) singer".

The hip-hop-influenced third track "Domino" begins with a doorbell sound, alluding to the pizza brand; the song also has "intense" beats, "distinctive" sounds, and high-pitched taepyeongso. It compares the group's ambition and confidence to a game of dominoes. The lyrics imply the group's actions encourage other to follow after them in a domino effect. "Ssick", the fourth track, is a mid-tempo hip-hop and EDM song whose title has the dual meaning of "sick", which in English is slang for "good", and the Korean word ssik (씩), which means "grin smile". It references the influence of fame and its attraction, and conveys the message feeling special about oneself is enough.

"The View", the fifth track, is described as a "rhythmic", "summery", and "hopeful healing", upbeat, synth-pop track. The song is based on an EDM sound; its lyrics are about winning over past difficulties and future uncertainties while feeling refreshed and optimistic. "Sorry, I Love You", the mid-tempo R&B sixth track expresses a feeling of guilt and regret for liking someone and potentially ruining a friendship. The seventh track "Silent Cry" is an alternative rock song about two people who cannot see each other's pain, and offers comfort to the silent, world-weary soul. The eighth track "Secret Secret" is a slow-tempo R&B song that conveys comfort and sympathy with the narrator wanting to tell their secrets to rain. "Star Lost", the dance-pop, soft rock ninth track, is a "feel-good" song with a nostalgic composition that calls on fans who feel alone to believe in themselves.

The upbeat, alternative R&B tenth track was performed by Bang Chan and Hyunjin; "Red Lights" features a "wild" feeling created by "violent" string sounds and electric guitar, giving it a "ripened sexy charm". Its lyrics use the theme of continuing to love someone despite having concerns and suffering, and talk about an unhealthy obsession with work. The summer-vibe, upbeat, dance-pop eleventh track "Surfin'" which is sung by Lee Know, Changbin, Felix, is described as "like a glass of carbonated water" with tropical sounds and marimba beats and lyrics about how having occasional little adventures can heal the soul and mind, allowing one to keep one's lives on track and not solely focus on work. "Gone Away", the twelfth track, is a ballad that describes an unrequited love and the frustration of someone who cannot to be with their lover; it is sung by Han, Seungmin, and I.N.

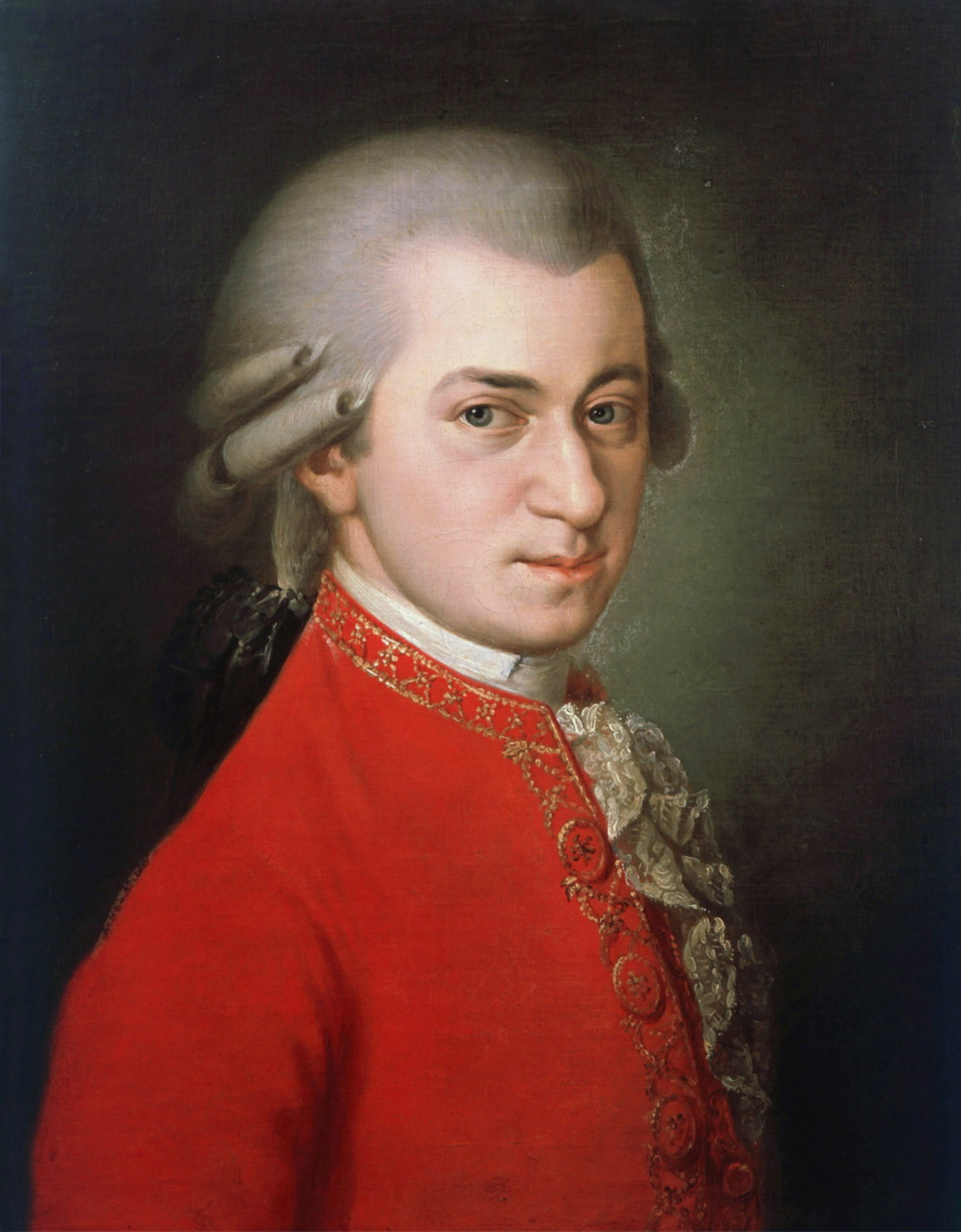
The title "Wolfgang" was inspired by Wolfgang Amadeus Mozart (pictured).

"Wolfgang", the hip-hop thirteenth track, describes a wolf pack making music by following Wolfgang Amadeus Mozart, and compares Stray Kids to the pack-hunting behavior of wolves. It was intended to convey a cohesive and solid appearance, and unstoppable will to pursue a goal. The album concludes with "Mixtape: Oh", a mid-tempo electropop song from the Mixtape Project; it has a reggaeton rhythm that describes the frustration of being clumsy and immature in front of the object of one's desire, and expresses feelings of resentment and frustration at those feelings.

== Release ==
Stray Kids released Noeasy on August 23, 2021, on CD in both limited-edition and standard versions and download, and on streaming platforms. A jewel case version of the album was released on August 30, one week after the official release date. Previewing and pre-orders for the limited-edition version began on July 22, concurrent with the trailer release, the two standard versions began one week later, and the jewel case version began on the day after the release date.

The album's limited and standard editions contain a CD-R, a package sleeve, a photobook, a lyrics book, a randomized member sticker, a folded poster, photo cards, and a double-sided photo card. The jewel case version, which features a member's solo cover, contains a CD-R, a sticker, and a randomized photo card. The limited version exclusively includes a randomized pop-up card and an all-member photo card set. A randomized poster, a frame photo card, and a special mini photo book are available through pre-order.

== Promotion ==
A scene in "Thunderous" trailer shows the "sound monster", who is Stray Kids' enemy, and Korean subtitles translating to "there has been a rampage going on by people who have lost their voices."

On July 22, 2021, Stray Kids released a two-and-half-minute-long official comeback trailer named "Thunderous" and announced their second studio album Noeasy was scheduled for release on August 23. The trailer was directed by Lee Hye-sung and produced by Sushivisual; it has a superhero theme and shows the members transforming into avenger corps against the ear-shaped "sound monster" by inventing technology and weapons, and brainstorming strategies in an apocalyptic world. On August 2, they released an exclusive clip with behind-the-scenes footage of the trailer. In the clip, the members tease the undisclosed lead single; Felix appears alone and greets the group's fans.

The group released snippet videos for the eight of the twelve tracks: "Cheese", "Red Lights", "Gone Away", "Surfin'", "Domino", "Sorry, I Love You", "The View", and "Secret Secret". The teaser images were uploaded in three sets. The first concept shows a red avant-garde outfit with a smoky background. The second depicts a black-and-white outfit with plain white or hanok background. The third shows pastel-colored casual outfits surrounded by neon lights.

The complete track list of Noeasy was announced on August 12, 2021, with "Thunderous" as the album's lead single, and the previous releases "Wolfgang" and "Mixtape: Oh". Two music-video teasers of"Thunderous" were released on August 20 and 21, and the performance-video teaser with SKZoo's costumes was released the following day. The online cover artwork, and the 24-minute-long documentary video Intro: "Noeasy" introducing the album, were also released with the album on August 23. To promote the album, the group held an online listening party via Stationhead on August 27 (KST), and appeared on several television and radio programs, including domestic music programs, Weekly Idol, After School Club, Day6's Kiss the Radio, and Cultwo Show. In addition to the lead single, the accompanying music videos for B-sides "The View", "Cheese", "Red Lights", "Surfin'", and "Gone Away", and live videos for "Sorry I Love You" and "Secret Secret" were also released.

=== Kingdom Week <No+> ===
Stray Kids appeared on Kingdom Week <No+>, a television variety show that benefits the winner of Kingdom: Legendary War, which aired on Mnet for seven episodes from August 17 to 23. The first and second episodes showed the group behind the scenes during Kingdom: Legendary War, with commentary by Felix and Seungmin. In the third, fourth, and fifth episodes, the members go to a villa to rest and play a game called "buddy catcher". The sixth episode includes the group's best performance chosen by the group members. The final episode, airing the day as the album's release, called Stray Kids Comeback Show "Noeasy", showcases the album.

=== Singles ===
"Thunderous" is the lead single from Noeasy. It was accompanied by a music video that was directed by Bang Jae-yeob, and posted to YouTube, Naver TV, and V Live. Both the single and the video were released alongside the album on August 23, 2021. "Thunderous" peaked at number thirty-three on South Korea's Gaon Digital Chart, number three on the US World Digital Song Sales, and number eighty on the Billboard Global 200, and took six wins from music programs: twice on Show Champion, twice on M Countdown, once on Music Bank, and once on Inkigayo. The accompanying music video reached 50 million views on YouTube in six days of release and 100 million views in fifty-five days, making it the group's fastest and fifth 100-million-view music video.

=== Live performances ===
Stray Kids gave the debut performance of Noeasy with a showcase, called Stray Kids Comeback Show "Noeasy", which was held on the day as the album's release as part of the final episode of Kingdom Week <No+>. The group performed the lead single "Thunderous", and the B-side "The View" for the first time at the show, alongside the show's final competition song "Wolfgang", and "Grow Up" from their debut EP I Am Not (2018). The group promoted "Thunderous" on South Korean music programs M Countdown, Music Bank, Show! Music Core, Inkigayo, and Show Champion for three weeks, August 26 – September 12, along with "The View" in the first week of promotion, and "Secret Secret" at Show! Music Core on September 4. "Domino" was also promoted and performed during September 24–26 on Music Bank, Show! Music Core, and Inkigayo. "Sorry, I Love You" was performed for the first time at Unite On: Live Concert on November 6.

Stray Kids also performed songs from Noeasy at several awards ceremonies and year-end annual music shows. The group gave the debut performances of the sub-unit tracks "Red Lights", "Surfin'", and "Gone Away" as a medley alongside "Thunderous" at the 2021 The Fact Music Awards on October 2. They performed "Domino" and "Thunderous", and also showed Lee Know's solo dance performance and 3Racha's rap performance, at the 2021 Asia Artist Awards on December 2. "Cheese" was given its debut performance on December 11 at the 2021 Mnet Asian Music Awards as part of medley titled Stray Kids World Domination, alongside the "hero" version of "Thunderous" and the unreleased song "Hey, Monster", whis was performed by 3Racha. The group performed "Thunderous" with a new arrangement at the 36th Golden Disc Awards on January 8, 2022, alongside "Top" and "Wolfgang".

The group performed "Thunderous" at the 2021 KBS Song Festival on December 17 at Namhansanseong; the performance was described as a "mega performance" and "action movie-like feeling". They performed the Christmas version of "Thunderous" at 2021 SBS Gayo Daejeon on December 25, using canes and group dance, and parodying Squid Game's ttakji, and dalgona game, alongside "Winter Falls" from the single album Christmas EveL, and covered IU's "Merry Christmas Ahead" performed by the members Changbin, Han, Felix, Seungmin, and I.N, as part of Christmas carol medley with other artists. They closed the year with a performance of "Thunderous" at 2021 MBC Gayo Daejejeon on December 31, adding the ringing of a New Year's bell before the New Year ceremony.

As an ambassador for the Korea Pavilion of Expo 2020 in Dubai, United Arab Emirates, Stray Kids performed "Thunderous" as part of the opening show of the Korea Pavilion's Korea National Day with the Little Angels and K-Tigers on January 17, 2022. The group also performed "Thunderous" alongside "Miroh", "God's Menu", and "Back Door" at the Korea National Day K-Pop Concert on the same day. The debut performance of "Silent Cry" was given at the group's second fan meeting on February 12 and 13 at Olympic Hall.

== Critical reception ==
Professional ratings
Review scores
Source	Rating
NME	4/5 stars

Upon its release, Noeasy received positive reviews from music critics. Writing for Rolling Stone India, Divyansha Dongre said Stray Kids "keeps their identity intact as they reflect on hate directed towards their artistry", which is "centered around a powerful message of self-expression". Tamar Herman from South China Morning Post said the album "offers a lot of different styles to suit listeners and finds its strength in the group's creativity and storytelling", and that "Stray Kids have grown with each release". Writing for Pinkvilla, Ayushi Agrawal considered the album a "a book that can only be penned by Stray Kids" and said the album "reinstated their tag of 'self-producing idols' in a way that is above and beyond any expectations", and that it "reaffirms the group's self-made mighty footing in the music industry". Ruby C writing for NME rated the album four stars out of five, and described the album as both claps of thunder and gradually subsiding storms, and "filled with depth, creative substance and a whole repertoire of 'noise' to boot".

Chu Seung-hyun from Seoul Economy Daily wrote Noeasy is "full of unique bold and energetic appearance". Crystal Bell of Teen Vogue described the album as "more than noise", and complimented the group, saying they were able to "perfect their ability to make even the quiet parts unabashedly loud, showing us how to live with the noise—not run away from it".

=== Year-end lists ===
Critic lists of Noeasy
Critic/Publication	Accolade	Rank	Ref.
Genius	50 Best Albums of 2021	5	
PopCrush	25 Best Pop Albums of 2021	Placed	
Rolling Stone India	10 Best K-Pop Albums of 2021	1	
South China Morning Post	25 Best K-Pop Albums of 2021	5	
Paste	The 30 Greatest K-Pop Albums of All Time	10	
Time	The Best K-Pop Songs and Albums of 2021	Placed	

Select year-end rankings of the tracks from Noeasy
Critic/Publication	Accolade	Work	Rank	Ref.
Genius Korea	20 Best B-Sides of 2021	"Cheese"	12	
Teen Vogue	The 54 Best K-Pop Songs of 2021	"Cheese"	Placed	
Tonplein	Best Songs of 2021	"Cheese"	41	
Tonplein	Best Songs of 2021	"Thunderous"	16	
Billboard	25 Best K-Pop Songs of 2021: Critics' Picks	"Thunderous"	9	
Bollywood Hungama	25 Korean Songs That Defined 2021	"Thunderous"	Placed	
Dazed	The Best K-Pop Tracks of 2021	"Thunderous"	12	
Spotify	Best K-Pop Songs of 2021	"Thunderous"	25	
Young Post	15 Best K-Pop Songs of 2021	"Thunderous"	15	
Rolling Stone India	21 Best Korean Music Videos of 2021	"Red Lights"	5	

=== Awards and nominations ===
List of awards and nominations received by Noeasy
Ceremony	Year	Category	Result	Ref.
Gaon Chart Music Awards	2022	Album of the Year – 3rd Quarter	Nominated	
Golden Disc Awards	2022	Best Album (Bonsang)	Won	
Seoul Music Awards	2022	Main Award	Nominated	
Seoul Music Awards	2022	Popularity Award	Nominated	
Seoul Music Awards	2022	K-wave Popularity Award	Nominated	

== Commercial performance ==
On August 17, 2021, it was reported pre-orders of Noeasy had surpassed 830,000 copies; on the day of release, August 23, pre-orders had exceeded 930,000, breaking the group's previous record of 300,000 pre-orders for In Life. According to Hanteo Chart, Noeasy sold 355,946 copies on the first day, and 641,589 copies in the first week of release.

Upon its release, Noeasy debuted and peaked at number one on the thirty-fifth and thirty-sixth weeks of the South Korean Gaon Album Chart for the issue dates of August 22–28, and August 29–September 4, respectively, becoming the group's fifth number-one album on the chart after Clé 1: Miroh, Clé: Levanter, Go Live, and In Life. The album had sold 1,127,800 copies by the end of August, making it the group's first million-selling album, and that of their label, JYP Entertainment. It was also the sixth South Korean million-selling album of 2021. (Note: After BTS's Butter, NCT Dream's Hot Sauce, Seventeen's Your Choice, Baekhyun's Bambi, and Exo's Don't Fight the Feeling) All of the album's fourteen tracks also simultaneously entered the Gaon Download Chart for the first time, all becoming top-40 hits. Noeasy received a million certification by Korea Music Content Association (KMCA) on October 7. Noeasy ranked at number eight on the 2021 year-end Gaon Album Chart, selling 1,303,106 copies as of the end of the year.

In Japan, Noeasy peaked at number two on the Oricon Albums Chart, and at number twenty-one on Billboard Japan Hot Albums. In the United States, the album entered the Billboard Heatseekers Album at number four, World Albums at number five, Independent Albums at number thirty-eight, and Top Current Album Sales at number sixty-nine for the chart issue date of September 4, 2021. Its tracks "Cheese", "Thunderous", "Domino", "Ssick", "The View", "Sorry, I Love You", "Red Lights", and "Wolfgang" simultaneously charted in the top 25 in the World Digital Song Sales. The album entered several national charts in Australia (fourteen), Austria (twelve), Belgium (both Flanders (thirteen), and Wallonia (five)), Croatia (thirty-four), Denmark (three), Finland (five), Germany (sixty-four), Hungary (five), Lithuania (twenty-two), the Netherlands (eighteen), Norway (twenty-seven), Poland (six), Spain (sixty-seven), and Switzerland (ten). It additionally entered the component charts of French Physical Albums (sixty-three), Swedish Physical Albums (ten), and the UK Album Downloads (twenty-six).

== Track listing ==
Noeasy track listing
No.	Title	Lyrics	Music	Arrangement	Length
1.	"Cheese"	Bang Chan (3Racha); Changbin (3Racha); Han (3Racha)	Bang Chan; Changbin; Han; Versachoi	Versachoi	3:02
2.	"Thunderous" (소리꾼)	Bang Chan; Changbin; Han	Bang Chan; Changbin; Han; HotSauce	HotSauce; Bang Chan	3:03
3.	"Domino"	Bang Chan; Changbin; Han	Bang Chan; Changbin; Han; Versachoi	Versachoi; Bang Chan	3:19
4.	"Ssick" (씩)	Bang Chan; Changbin; Han	Bang Chan; Changbin; Han; ByHVN (153/Joombas)	ByHVN; Bang Chan	3:10
5.	"The View"	Bang Chan; Changbin; Han; Krysta Youngs	Bang Chan; Changbin; Han; Telykast; Krysta Youngs	Telykast; Bang Chan	3:22
6.	"Sorry, I Love You" (좋아해서 미안)	Changbin	Changbin; Millionboy	Millionboy; Bang Chan	2:58
7.	"Silent Cry"	Bang Chan; Changbin; Han	Bang Chan; Changbin; Han; Hong Ji-sang	Hong Ji-sang	3:30
8.	"Secret Secret" (말할 수 없는 비밀)	Han	JinbyJin; Han; Moa "Cazzi Opeia" Carlebecker; Gabriel Brandes	JinbyJin	3:30
9.	"Star Lost"	Bang Chan; Changbin; Han; Earattack; Callous	Earattack; DaviDior	DaviDior; Earattack	3:35
10.	"Red Lights" (강박; Bang Chan, Hyunjin)	Bang Chan; Hyunjin	Bang Chan; Hyunjin	Bang Chan; Versachoi	3:10
11.	"Surfin'" (Lee Know, Changbin, Felix)	Changbin; Lee Know; Felix	Changbin; Lee Know; Felix; Versachoi	Versachoi	3:11
12.	"Gone Away" (Han, Seungmin, I.N)	Han; Seungmin; I.N	Han; Seungmin; I.N; Armadillo; Gump	Armadillo; Gump	4:01
13.	"Wolfgang"	Bang Chan; Changbin; Han	Bang Chan; Changbin; Han; Versachoi	Versachoi; Bang Chan	3:11
14.	"Mixtape: Oh" (애)	Bang Chan; Changbin; Han	Bang Chan; Changbin; Han; Kobee; Holy M	Kobee; Holy M	3:33
Total length:					46:35

Notes

- "Mixtape: Oh" is stylized as "Mixtape : OH".
- Track titles in Korean translation:
  - Track 2 "소리꾼" (Sori-kkun) means "singer" of Korean traditional music storytelling pansori, and a play with the Korean word "noise" (sori) and the suffix -kkun, an indicator that a thing is someone's profession or hobby.
  - Track 4 "씩" (Ssik) means "grin smile" and play with the word "sick".
  - Track 6 "좋아해서 미안" (Jo-ahaeseo Mi-an) means as same as the English title.
  - Track 8 "말할 수 없는 비밀" (Malhal Su Eomneun Bimil) means "a secret that can't be told".
  - Track 10 "강박" (Gangbak) means "compulsion" or "obsession".
  - Track 14 "애" (Ae) means "love" or "child".

== Credits and personnel ==
Musicians

- Stray Kids
  - Bang Chan (3Racha) – lead vocals (except 11, 12), background vocals (5, 7, 8, 9, 13, 14), lyrics (except 6, 8, 11, 12), composition (except 6, 8, 9, 11, 12), arrangement (2, 3, 4, 5, 6, 10, 13), instrumentation (3, 6)
  - Changbin (3Racha) – lead vocals (except 10, 12), background vocals (5, 7, 13, 14), lyrics (except 8, 10, 12), composition (except 8, 9, 10, 12)
  - Han (3Racha) – lead vocals (except 10, 11), background vocals (5, 7, 8, 9, 13, 14), lyrics (except 6, 10, 11), composition (except 6, 9, 10, 11), vocal directing (8)
  - Lee Know – lead vocals (except 10, 12), background vocals (5, 7), lyrics (11), composition (11)
  - Hyunjin – lead vocals (except 11, 12), background vocals (5, 7), lyrics (10), composition (10)
  - Felix – lead vocals (except 10, 12), background vocals (5, 7, 14), lyrics (11), composition (11)
  - Seungmin – lead vocals (except 10, 11), background vocals (5, 7, 12), lyrics (12), composition (12)
  - I.N – lead vocals (except 10, 11), background vocals (5, 7), lyrics (12), composition (12)
- Versachoi – composition (1, 3, 11, 13), arrangement (1, 3, 10, 11, 13), instrumentation (1, 3, 10, 11, 13)
- HotSauce – composition (2), arrangement (2), keyboard (2), drum programming (2), computer programming (2)
- ByHVN (153/Joombas) – composition (4), arrangement (4), keyboard (4), drum (4), bass (4)
- Krysta Youngs – lyrics (5), composition (5), background vocals (5)
- Telykast – composition (5), arrangement (5), instrumentation (5), drums (5), keyboard (5), computer programming (5)
- Millionboy – composition (6), arrangement (6), instrumentation (6)
- Hong Ji-sang – composition (7), arrangement (7), background vocals (7), electric guitar (7), bass (7), keyboard (7), computer programming (7)
- JinbyJin – composition (8), arrangement (8), guitar (8), piano (8), synthesizer (8), computer programming (8), vocal directing (8)
- Moa "Cazzi Opeia" Carlebecker – composition (8)
- Gabriel Brandes – composition (8)
- Earattack – lyrics (9), composition (9), arrangement (9), background vocals (9), instrumentation (9)
- Callous – lyrics (9)
- DaviDior – composition (9), arrangement (9), instrumentation (9)
- Nickko Young – guitar (10)
- Armadillo – composition (12), arrangement (12), instrumentation (12)
- Gump – composition (12), arrangement (12), instrumentation (12)
- Jung So-ri – guitar (12)
- Jeon Sang-min – piano (12)
- Yi Sung-chan – bass (12)
- Holy M – composition (14), arrangement (14), bass (14), computer programming (14)
- Kobee – composition (14), arrangement (14), guitar (14), drum (14), computer programming (14)

Technical

- KayOne Lee – digital editing (except 4, 7, 9, 11, 12, 14)
- HotSauce – digital editing (2)
- Lee Hwa-shin – digital editing (4)
- Jung Yu-ra – digital editing (9, 12)
- Woo Min-jung – digital editing (11)
- Lee Sang-yeop – recording (1, 2, 6, 9, 14)
- Lim Hong-jin – recording (2, 7, 10)
- Goo Hye-jin – recording (3, 4, 5, 7, 8, 12, 13)
- Eom Se-hee – recording (6)
- Hong Ji-sang – recording (7)
- Park Eun-jung – recording (7, 9), mixing (11)
- Bang Chan (3Racha) – recording (10)
- Choi Hye-jin – recording (11), mixing (12)
- Yoon Won-kwon – mixing (1, 3)
- Tony Maserati – mixing (2, 13)
- Master Key – mixing (4, 6)
- Jay-P Gu – mixing (5)
- Shin Bong-won – mixing (7)
- Lee Tae-sub – mixing (8, 9, 12, 14)
- David K. Younghyun – mix engineering (2, 13)
- Kang Seo-yeon – mix engineering (5)
- Kwon Nam-woo – mastering (except 13)
- Chris Gehringer – mastering (13)
- Will Quinnell – mastering assistant (13)

Others

- J.Y. Park "The Asiansoul" – executive producer
- Jimmy Jeong – executive producer
- Bang Jae-yeob – video production, director
- Jung Min-hee (Mu: Creative) – photographer
- Kim Chan (Prod) – photographer
- Jay – hair/makeup director
- Seo Ji-hye – hair/makeup director
- Jung Min-ju – hair/makeup director
- Jeon Ji-won – hair/makeup director
- Park Jung-ah – style director
- Lee So-young – style director
- Ahn Yu-na – style director
- Hyun Seung-jae (Zesstype) – album logo design
- Laundry Office – album design

Locations

- JYP Publishing (KOMCA) – original publishing (all), sub-publishing (5, 8)
- 153/Joombas Music Publishing – original publishing (4)
- Trevor Klaiman Music (BMI) – original publishing (5)
- Kyle M T Music (ASCAP) – original publishing (5)
- Linus AK Music (ASCAP) – original publishing (5)
- Petal Rock Publishing (ASCAP) – original publishing (5)
- Copyright Control – original publishing (6, 9, 12), sub-publishing (5)
- EKKO Music Rights Europe (powered by CTGA) – original publishing (8), sub-publishing (8)
- Fujipacific Music Korea Inc. – sub-publishing (5)
- JYPE Studios – recording (except 10), mixing (8, 9, 10, 11, 12, 14)
- Jisang's Studio – recording (7)
- Channie's Room – recording (10)
- Studio DDeepKick – mixing (1, 3)
- Chapel Swing Studios (Valley Glen) – mixing (2, 13)
- 821 Sound – mixing (4, 6), mastering (except 13)
- Klang Studio – mixing (5)
- Glab Studios – mixing (7)
- Sterling Sound – mastering (13)

== Charts ==
=== Weekly charts ===
Chart performance for Noeasy
Chart (2021–2022)	Peak position
Australian Albums (ARIA)	14
Austrian Albums (Ö3 Austria)	12
Belgian Albums (Ultratop Flanders)	13
Belgian Albums (Ultratop Wallonia)	5
Croatian International Albums (HDU)	3
Danish Albums (Hitlisten)	3
Dutch Albums (Album Top 100)	18
Finnish Albums (Suomen virallinen lista)	5
French Physical Albums (SNEP)	63
German Albums (Offizielle Top 100)	64
Hungarian Albums (MAHASZ)	5
Japanese Albums (Oricon)	2
Japanese Hot Albums (Billboard Japan)	21
Lithuanian Albums (AGATA)	22
Norwegian Albums (VG-lista)	27
Polish Albums (ZPAV)	6
South Korean Albums (Gaon)	1
Spanish Albums (Promusicae)	67
Swedish Physical Albums (Sverigetopplistan)	5
Swiss Albums (Schweizer Hitparade)	10
UK Album Downloads (Official Charts)	26
US Heatseekers Albums (Billboard)	4
US Independent Albums (Billboard)	38
US Top Current Album Sales (Billboard)	69
US World Albums (Billboard)	5

=== Monthly charts ===
Monthly chart performance for Noeasy
Chart (2021)	Peak position
Japanese Albums (Oricon)	6
South Korean Albums (Gaon)	1

=== Year-end charts ===
2021 year-end chart performance for Noeasy
Chart (2021)	Position
Belgian Albums (Ultratop Wallonia)	165
Hungarian Albums (MAHASZ)	44
Japanese Albums (Oricon)	52
South Korean Albums (Gaon)	8

2022 year-end chart performance for Noeasy
Chart (2022)	Position
Hungarian Albums (MAHASZ)	21
South Korean Albums (Circle)	56

2023 year-end chart performance for Noeasy
Chart (2023)	Position
Hungarian Albums (MAHASZ)	39
South Korean Albums (Circle)	89

== Certifications and sales ==
Certifications and sales figures for Noeasy
Region	Certification	Certified units/sales
Japan Physical	—	53,300
Japan Digital	—	869
South Korea (KMCA)	2× Million	2,126,039
United States	—	16,100

== Release history ==
Release dates and formats for Noeasy
Region	Date	Format	Version	Label	Ref.
Various	August 23, 2021	Digital download; streaming	—N/a	JYP	
South Korea	August 23, 2021	CD	Limited; standard	JYP	
South Korea	August 30, 2021	CD	Jewel case	JYP	

== See also ==
- List of best-selling albums in South Korea
- List of Gaon Album Chart number ones of 2021
