= Mixtape: Oh =

2021 single by Stray Kids

Single by Stray Kids

from the album Noeasy
- Language: Korean; English
- Released: June 26, 2021
- Studio: JYPE (Seoul)
- Genre: Electropop; reggaeton
- Length: 3:32
- Label: JYP
- Composers: Bang Chan; Changbin; Han; Kobee; Holy M
- Lyricists: Bang Chan; Changbin; Han

Stray Kids singles chronology
"Going Dumb" (2021)	"Mixtape: Oh" (2021)	"Thunderous" (2021)

Music video
- "Mixtape: Oh" on YouTube

"Mixtape: Oh" (stylized as "Mixtape : OH", Korean: 애; RR: Ae; lit. "Child", "Love") is a song recorded by South Korean boy band Stray Kids. It was surprise-released as a digital single through JYP Entertainment on June 26, 2021, along with the accompanying music video, as a part of the group's Mixtape Project.

Written by the group's in-house production team 3Racha, Kobee, and Holy M, "Mixtape: Oh" is described as a mid-tempo electropop song with reggaeton rhythm, telling about the frustration of feeling immature in front of the one they love lyrically. Commercially, the song debuted atop Billboard World Digital Song Sales, becoming the group's first number-one single.

== Background and release ==
On June 15, 2021, after succeeding from Kingdom: Legendary War, it was revealed that Stray Kids would release a new song as a digital single in late June as a part of the Mixtape Project, like "Mixtape: Gone Days" and "Mixtape: On Track" according to multiple official music sources. JYP Entertainment confirmed that the group was preparing the song.

On June 26 at 00:00 AM (KST), "Mixtape: Oh" was released, alongside the accompanying music video with no prior announcement, which featured all eight members including Hyunjin, who had been on a hiatus from group activities since late February due to bullying accusations and announced he will be resuming the group's activities starting from July. On the same day, the group also released individual concept photos. Later, the song was included on the group's second studio album Noeasy, which was released on August 23.

== Lyrics and composition ==
Musically, "Mixtape: Oh" is a mid-tempo contemporary electronic pop song based on the reggaeton rhythm, with the influence of deep house and tropical house written by the group's producer team 3Racha (Bang Chan, Changbin, and Han) and co-composed and arranged by Kobee and Holy M in the key of B minor, 88 beats per minute with a running time of 3 minutes and 32 seconds. Lyrically, the song describes the honest feelings of a person in love and representing a troubled mind. The title "애" (RR: Ae) both means "a child" (in native Korean) and "love" (愛 in Hanja) in Korean with the double meaning as the theme, it expresses one's feelings of resentment and frustration at oneself for being clumsy and immature in front of the person they love.

== Commercial performance ==
In South Korea, "Mixtape: Oh" debuted at number 18 on the Gaon Download Chart, and number 97 on the BGM Chart. In Japan, the song debuted and peaked at number 59 on Billboard Japan Download Songs. In Singapore, the song debuted at number 19 on the RIAS Top Regional Chart. In the United States, the song debuted at number one on Billboard World Digital Song Sales, becoming the first song to reach number one on the chart.

== Music video ==
The accompanying music video was premiered surprisingly on JYP Entertainment's YouTube channel on June 26, 2021, the same day as the song's release date. It was directed by Jimmy from VIA Production. The music video features a light blue tone throughout where all members are in a dilemma within themselves and they want to reconcile with each other.

== Live performance ==
Stray Kids performed "Mixtape: Oh" for the first time on the Japanese YouTube channel program The First Take on October 29, 2021, making it the first Korean and non-Japanese song to be performed at the program.

== Credits ==
Credits adapted from Melon.

Recording and management

- Originally published and sub-published at JYP Publishing (KOMCA)
- Recorded and mixed at JYPE Studios
- Mastered at 821 Sound Mastering

Personnel

- Stray Kids – primary vocals
  - Bang Chan (3Racha) – background vocals, lyrics, composition
  - Changbin (3Racha) – background vocals, lyrics, composition
  - Han (3Racha) – background vocals, lyrics, composition
  - Felix – background vocals
- Kobee – composition, arrangement, guitar, drum, computer programing
- Holy M – composition, arrangement, bass, synthesizer, computer programing
- Lee Sang-yeop – recording
- Lee Tae-sub – mixing
- Kwon Nam-woo – mastering

== Charts ==
Chart performance for "Mixtape: Oh"
Chart (2021)	Peak position
Japan Download (Billboard Japan)	59
Singapore Top Regional (RIAS)	19
South Korea Download (Gaon)	18
South Korea BGM (Gaon)	97
US World Digital Song Sales (Billboard)	1

== Release history ==
Release dates and formats for "Mixtape: Oh"
Region	Date	Format	Label	Ref.
Various	June 26, 2021	Digital download; streaming	JYP	
