= Wolfgang (song) =

2021 song by Stray Kids

Song by Stray Kids

from the EP Kingdom <Final: Who Is the King?> and the album Noeasy
- Language: Korean; English
- Released: May 28, 2021
- Studio: JYPE Studios (Seoul)
- Genre: Hip hop
- Length: 3:10
- Label: Stone; JYP
- Composers: Bang Chan; Changbin; Han; Versachoi
- Lyricists: Bang Chan; Changbin; Han

Audio video
- "Wolfgang" (Kingdom) on YouTube "Wolfgang" (Noeasy) on YouTube

"Wolfgang" (stylized in all caps) is a song recorded by South Korean boy band Stray Kids. It was released on May 28, 2021, through Stone Music Entertainment and distributed by Genie Music from the extended play Kingdom <Final: Who Is the King?>. Written by the band's producer 3Racha and Versachoi, it featured as a song for the group's final competition of the television program Kingdom: Legendary War.

== Background ==
The pre-listening of "Wolfgang" for the Mnet's television show Kingdom: Legendary War's final competition song of 6-team contestants was unveiled after part 2 of the round 3 competition was finished on May 27, 2021. The full song was released on May 28, 12:00 PM (KST), together with other 5 songs from 5 contestants. Stray Kids ends up as a winner of the show.

Later, the song was included on the group's second studio album Noeasy, which was released on August 23. The album version of the song includes member Hyunjin, who was in hiatus for most of the program.

== Lyrics and composition ==
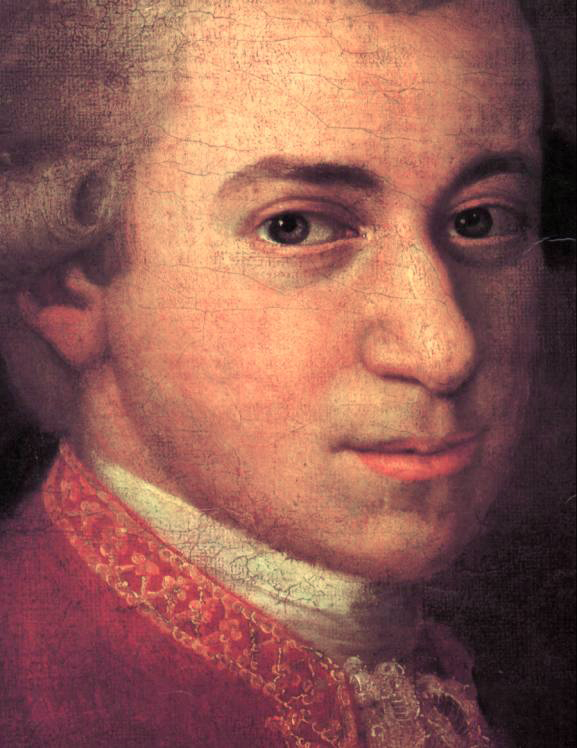
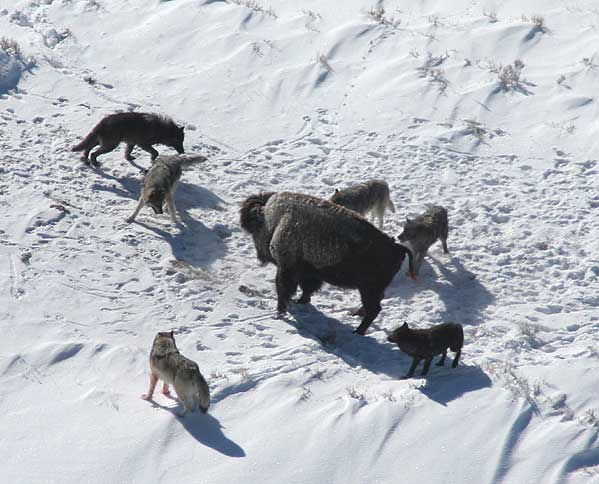
The title "Wolfgang" was inspired from Wolfgang Amadeus Mozart (left) while the lyrics compare with a wolf pack (right).

"Wolfgang" was written by the group's producer 3Racha (Bang Chan, Changbin, and Han), and co-composed with Versachoi, in the key of D minor, 162 beats per minute with a running time of 3 minutes and 10 seconds. The title refers to the Austrian composer of the Classical period, Wolfgang Amadeus Mozart. The song describes a wolf pack making music by following Wolfgang and compares the habit of a wolf to hunt for prey in a group to Stray Kids. It was intended to imprint a cohesive and solid appearance and unstoppable will toward the goal.

== Commercial performance ==
In South Korea, "Wolfgang" entered the 22nd week of the Gaon Digital Chart at number 163, becoming the group's first-ever song to appear on the chart. On its 23rd week, it jumped to number 138, becoming Stray Kids' highest chart on the Gaon Digital Chart. For the Billboard's charts issue date of June 12, 2021, the song also entered at number 53 on the K-pop 100, number 4 on the World Digital Song Sales, and number 109 on the Global Excl. US.

== Live performance ==
The song was performed for the first time on the final episode of Kingdom: Legendary War on June 3, 2021. The stage was decorated with a wolf concept, expressing the characteristics of a group of wolves. The song also performed on Noeasy comeback showcase from the final episode of Kingdom Week <No+>, a television variety show that benefits the winner of Kingdom: Legendary War, along with the lead single "Thunderous", the B-side "The View", and "Grow Up" from the debut EP I Am Not (2018). The group performed "Wolfgang" at 36th Golden Disc Awards on January 8, 2022, alongside "Thunderous", and "Top".

== Credits and personnel ==
Credits adapted from Melon.

Recording and management

- Originally published by JYP Publishing (KOMCA)
- Recorded at JYPE Studios
- Mixed and mix engineered at Chapel Swing Studios, Valley Glen, Los Angeles
- Mastered at Sterling Sound, New York City

Personnel

- Stray Kids – primary vocals
  - Bang Chan (3Racha) – background vocals, lyrics, composition, arrangement
  - Changbin (3Racha) – background vocals, lyrics, composition
  - Han (3Racha) – background vocals, lyrics, composition
- Versachoi – composition, arrangement, all instruments
- KayOne Lee – vocals editing
- Gu Hye-jin – recording
- Tony Maserati - mixing
- David K. Younghyun – mix engineering
- Chris Gehringer – mastering
  - Will Quinnell – mastering assistant

== Charts ==
Chart performance for "Wolfgang"
| Chart (2021) | Peak position |
|---|---|
| Global Excl. US (Billboard) | 109 |
| Malaysia (RIM) | 6 |
| Singapore Top Regional (RIAS) | 15 |
| South Korea (Gaon) | 138 |
| South Korea (K-Pop 100) | 53 |
| US World Digital Song Sales (Billboard) | 4 |
