= Winter Falls (song) =

2021 single by Stray Kids

Single by Stray Kids

from the EP Christmas EveL
- Language: Korean; English
- A-side: "Christmas EveL"
- Released: November 29, 2021
- Studio: JYPE, Seoul
- Genre: Pop
- Length: 3:35
- Label: JYP
- Composers: Han; Earattack
- Lyricist: Han

Stray Kids singles chronology
"Scars" (2021)	"Winter Falls" / "Christmas EveL" (2021)	"Maniac" (2022)

Music video
- "Winter Falls" on YouTube

"Winter Falls" is a song recorded by South Korean boy band Stray Kids. It was released simultaneously with the "holiday special single" album Christmas EveL as a lead single, alongside the title track on November 29, 2021, through JYP Entertainment and distributed by Dreamus. Written by Han, a member of Stray Kids and 3Racha, and Earattack, the song is a ballad pop song, expressing a person who tries to erase the complicated thoughts about a former relationship that come to mind during winter.

== Background ==
On November 11, Stray Kids announce to release the single album Christmas EveL, scheduled for release on November 29, 2021. The official track listing was posted on November 19, serving "Winter Falls" as a lead single, alongside "Christmas EveL". Two music video teasers of "Christmas EveL" were released on November 22, and 28, respectively. "Winter Falls" was released simultaneously as the single album on November 29. Stray Kids did not promote the song on any music program, as a thank-you gift to their fans.

== Composition and lyrics ==
"Winter Falls" is a ballad pop song written by Han, a member of Stray Kids and in-house production team, 3Racha and co-composed with Earattack in the key of B minor, 98 beats per minute with a running time of 3 minutes and 35 seconds. Lyrically, "Winter Falls" is about a person who tries to erase the complicated thoughts about a former relationship that come to mind during winter and the end of the year.

== Commercial performance ==
In South Korea, "Winter Falls" debuted at number 151 on the Gaon Digital Chart. In Hungary, the song entered Single Top 40 at number 17.

== Music video ==
An accompanying music video of "Winter Falls" was premiered on November 30, 2021, a day after Christmas EveL release. Directed by Novvkim, the music video was shot from night to morning, expressing the members are reminiscing about the times gone. In the end, all members gathered and watched a telephone booth on fire together and it snowed after that.

== Live performance ==
Stray Kids gave a debut performance of "Winter Falls" at 2021 SBS Gayo Daejeon on December 25, alongside the Christmas version of "Thunderous", and the cover version of IU's "Merry Christmas Ahead", performed by Changbin, Han, Felix, Seungmin, and I.N, as part of Christmas carol medley with various artists.

== Credits and personnel ==
Credits adapted from the official website.

Locations

- JYP Publishing (KOMCA) – original publishing
- Copyright Control – original publishing
- JYPE Studios – recording, mixing
- 821 Sound Mastering – mastering

Personnel

- Stray Kids – lead vocals
  - Han (3Racha) – lyrics, composition, background vocals
- Earattack – composition, arrangement, background vocals, all instruments
- Kim Jong-sung – guitar
- KayOne Lee – digital editing
- Goo Hye-jin – recording
- Choi Hye-jin – recording
- Lee Tae-sub – mixing
- Kwon Nam-woo – mastering

== Charts ==
=== Weekly charts ===
Chart performance for "Winter Falls"
Chart (2021)	Peak position
Hungary (Single Top 40)	17
South Korea (Gaon)	151

=== Monthly charts ===
Monthly chart performance for "Christmas EveL"
Chart (2021)	Position
South Korea Download (Gaon)	68

== Release history ==
Release dates and formats for "Winter Falls"
Region	Date	Format	Label	Ref.
Various	November 29, 2021	Digital download; streaming	JYP	
