= New Kids: Continue =

- Digital and Red version cover.

EP by iKON
- Released: August 2, 2018
- Studio: YG (Seoul)
- Length: 17:18
- Language: Korean
- Label: YG
- Producer: B.I

IKON chronology
Return (2018)	New Kids: Continue (2018)	New Kids: The Final (2018)

Singles from New Kids: Continue
- 1. "Killing Me" Released: August 2, 2018; 2. "Freedom" Released: August 2, 2018

New Kids: Continue is the first extended play of South Korean boy band iKON. It is the third of the group's four-part album series that began with the single album New Kids: Begin and ended with the second extended play New Kids: The Final. It was released by YG Entertainment on August 2, 2018. iKON's leader B.I was credited as the only record producer of the EP. The EP contains 5 songs including the lead single "Killing Me", all written or co-written by B.I. The physical album comes in two versions: Red & Blue.

== Composition ==
The lead single of the album, "Killing Me", was released with a music video on August 2, 2018. The song, a trap-dance track driven by wailing synths and a riotous beat, describes feelings after a "painful breakup"; its title was inspired by the common phrase "this is killing me". The music video conveyed the emotional devastation described in the lyrics through the use of flames, darkness, brightly hued sets, and expressive dance movements. "Freedom" was released as the second single (referred to as "sub title") of the album on August 2. It is described as a rock-infused song.

== Promotion ==
iKON held a dance cover contest for the song "Killing Me" from August 20 to September 30, 2018. Three winners were announced at the end of the contest.

== Reception ==
=== Commercial ===
In South Korea, New Kids: Continue debuted at 2 on the Gaon Album Chart. In the United States, the album was No. 4 on Billboard World Albums, with about 1,000 copies sold. In South Korea, "Killing Me" debuted at 19 on the Gaon Weekly Chart and rose to a peak of 9 the next week. The song debuted at No. 2 on Billboard's World Digital Song Chart, marking the group's best sales to date.

=== Critical ===
South China Morning Post praised the diversity and wild genre shift of the album but criticized it for following a predictable and standard pop formula. Billboard praised the title song "Killing Me", saying that “unlike most K-pop songs, it forgoes a titular earworm hook, choosing instead a more dramatic declaration.”

== Track listing ==
No.	Title	Lyrics	Music	Arrangement	Length
1.	"Killing Me" (죽겠다; juggetda)	B.I	B.I; Joe Rhee; R.Tee	R.Tee; Joe Rhee	3:13
2.	"Freedom" (바람; balam)	B.I; Bobby; Seung	Millennium; B.I; Seung	Millennium	3:21
3.	"Only You"	B.I; Bobby	B.I; Kang Uk-jin	Kang Uk-jin	3:32
4.	"Cocktail" (칵테일; kagteil)	B.I; Bobby	B.I; Millennium	Millennium	3:46
5.	"Just for You" (줄게; julge)	B.I	B.I; Kang Uk-jin; LIØN	Kang Uk-jin; LIØN	3:21
Total length:					17:00

== Charts ==
Chart (2018)	Peak position
Japan Weekly Albums (Oricon)	25
Japan Hot Albums (Billboard Japan)	22
South Korean Albums (Gaon)	2
US Billboard Top Heatseekers	15
US Billboard World Albums	4
US Billboard Independent Albums	33

== Awards and nominations ==
=== Music program awards ===
Song	Program	Date	Ref.
"Killing Me"	M Countdown (Mnet)	August 9, 2018	

== Release history ==
Country	Date	Label	Format	Ref.
Various	August 2, 2018	YG	Digital download, CD	
