= Thunderous =

2021 single by Stray Kids

- Japanese version regular cover

Single by Stray Kids

from the album Noeasy
- Language: Korean; Japanese
- Released: August 23, 2021
- Studio: JYPE (Seoul)
- Genre: Hip hop; trap
- Length: 3:03
- Label: JYP
- Composers: Bang Chan; Changbin; Han; HotSauce
- Lyricists: Bang Chan; Changbin; Han

Stray Kids singles chronology
"Mixtape: Oh" (2021)	"Thunderous" (2021)	"Scars" (2021)

Music video
- "Thunderous" on YouTube

"Thunderous" (Korean: 소리꾼; RR: Sori-kkun, lit. "Singer" (of Pansori)) is a song by South Korean boy band Stray Kids, from their second studio album Noeasy. It was released as the lead single on August 23, 2021, through JYP Entertainment. Written by 3Racha, a production team from members of Stray Kids, and HotSauce, the song is described as a hip hop, and trap song with the elements of Korean traditional music (gugak), and brass instruments, expressing the firm belief that they will not be discouraged and keep to their principles no matter what anyone says. The Japanese version of "Thunderous", titled "Sorikun" (ソリクン), was released on October 13, 2021, together with "Scars" as a double A-side single, through Epic Records Japan.

Commercially, the song debuted at number 33 on the Gaon Digital Chart, making their highest charting song ever, number 3 on the Billboard World Digital Song Sales, number 80 on the Global 200. It was promoted on several South Korean music programs and took six wins from music programs, such as Show Champion, M Countdown, Music Bank, and Inkigayo. The accompanying music video reached 100 million views in 55 days after being uploaded, making it their fifth and fastest to hit 100-million-view music video. The Japanese version peaked at number 2 on the Oricon Singles Chart.

== Background and release ==
On July 22, 2021, Stray Kids announced the release of their second studio album Noeasy, set to be released on August 23, 2021, with the "Thunderous" trailer. The full track listing was released on August 12, and announced "Thunderous" will serve as a title track of the album. The music video teasers were released on August 20–21, and the performance video teaser with SKZoo costumes on the following day. The song was released on the same day with the album and accompanying music video.

On July 30, 2021, Stray Kids announced to release the second Japanese single on October 13 with five physical editions: three first press limited (A, B, C), regular, and FC. On September 10, The Japanese version of "Thunderous", titled "Sorikun" (ソリクン), was announced to release as a double A-side single in Japan together with "Scars". It was pre-released on September 23 to digital music, and streaming platform. The performance music was premiered on September 23.

== Composition ==
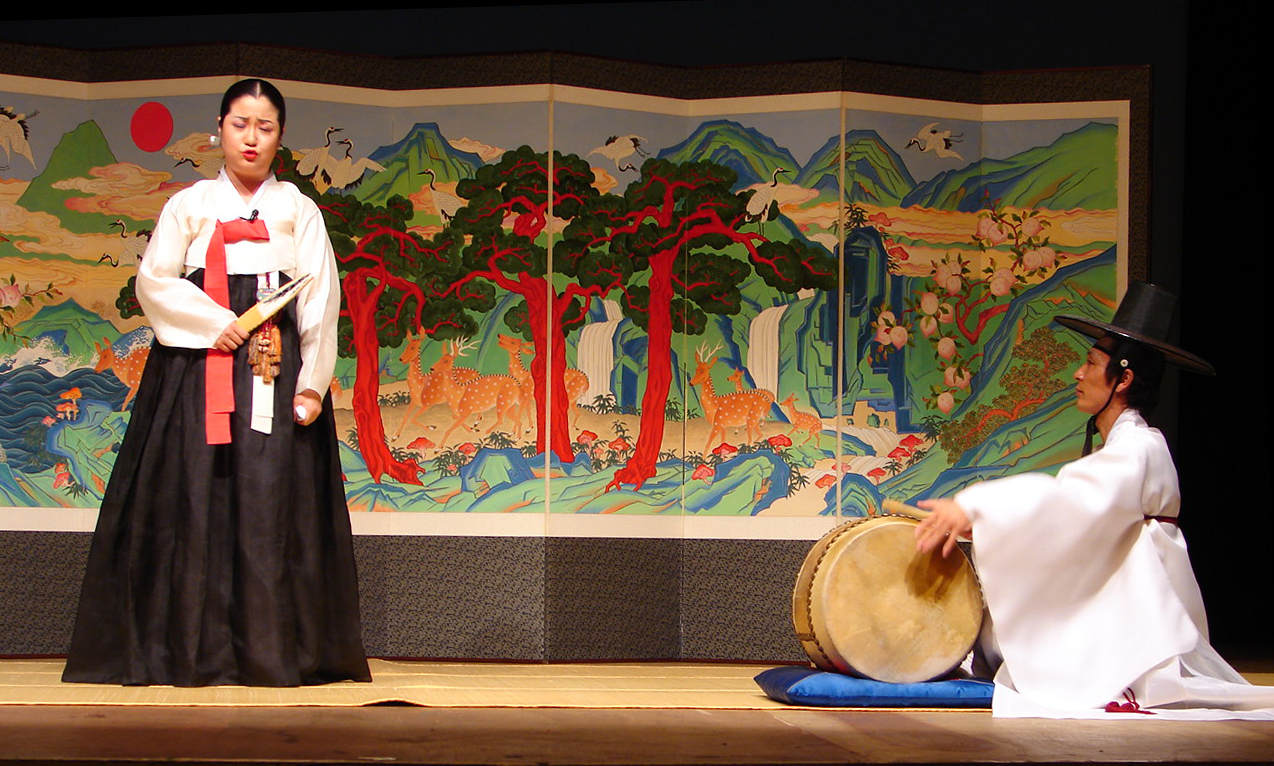
The Korean title of the lead single "Thunderous", "Sori-kkun" is inspired by a singer position of pansori of the same name.

"Thunderous" was written by the group's production team 3Racha (Bang Chan, Changbin, Han), and JYP in-house production team HotSauce, is a hip hop and trap song that includes various elements of Korean traditional music (gugak), brass instruments, and chuimsae. The song composed in the key of C♯ major, 172 beats per minute with a running time of 3 minutes and 3 seconds. The Korean title "Sori-kkun" has a dual meaning of jansori-kkun (잔소리꾼) means "nagger", and sori-kkun (소리꾼) means "singer" of pansori. As generation Z, the song expresses the firm belief that they will not be discouraged and keep to their principles no matter what anyone says. According to the interview, Felix, a member of the group, described the concept of "Thunderous" as "black and red", and "dokkaebi". Bang Chan also said, "The message of the song is that Stray Kids, as sorikkun (singer), will face off against the jansorikkun (naggers), and confidently let loose our sound."

== Commercial performance ==
"Thunderous" debuted at number 33 on the thirty-fifth week of South Korea's Gaon Digital Chart for the issue date of August 22–28, 2021, make their highest charting song ever, and number 90 on the Billboard K-pop 100. In Japan, the song entered at number 88. In Malaysia, the song peaked at number 14 on Top 20 Most Streamed Songs. In Singapore, the song debuted at number 24 on the RIAS Top Streaming Chart.

In Hungary, the debuted at number 7 on Single Top 40. In the United Kingdom, the song debuted at number 82 on the Singles Sales Chart for the chart issue date of August 27 – September 2, 2021, becoming the group's first-ever song to appear on the charts. In the United States, the song debuted at number 3 on the World Digital Song Sales for the chart issue date of September 4, 2021. The song also debuted at 80 on the Billboard Global 200.

The double A-side single with "Scars" debuted at number two on the Oricon Singles Chart, selling 119,963 copies in the first week, surpassing 37,157 copies of "Top" (Japanese version). The single also entered Billboard Japan Top Single Sales at number two, selling 182,405 copies in its first week.

== Music video ==
The accompanying music video of "Thunderous" was premiered on August 24, 2021, to YouTube, Naver TV, and V Live. The music video teasers were released on August 20–21, Directed by Bang Jae-yeob, and shoot in cinematic scale, the music video mash-up Korean historical and modern styles, like sports cars in front of the palace, Stray Kids wearing modern clothes among the people in hanbok. It included Korean traditional culture like aak, pungmul nori, Bukcheong lion mask, etc.

On August 30, the music video uploaded on YouTube reached 50 million views in 6 days. It surpassed 100 million views on October 18, for 55 days, making it the group's fifth 100-million-view music video, following "God's Menu", "Back Door", "Miroh", and "My Pace", and their fastest music video to hit the milestone, surpassing "God's Menu" with 71 days, and 200 million views on May 11, 2022.

== Live performances ==
"Thunderous" was performed for the first time at a showcase held on the same day as the release date, as part of Kingdom Week <No+>, a television variety show that benefits the winner of Kingdom: Legendary War. The song was also promoted on several music programs in South Korea for three weeks, August 26 – September 12, including M Countdown, Music Bank, Show! Music Core, Inkigayo, and Show Champion, along with "The View" in the first week of promotion, except Music Bank, and "Secret Secret" at Show! Music Core on September 4.

"Thunderous" was also performed at several awards ceremonies, including 2021 The Fact Music Awards on October 2; the 2021 Asia Artist Awards on December 2; the 2021 Mnet Asian Music Awards, arranged in the "hero" version as part of medley, titled Stray Kids World Domination; 36th Golden Disc Awards with new arrangement on January 8, 2022. At the year-end annual music shows, "Thunderous" was performed at the 2021 KBS Song Festival on December 17, which shot at Namhansanseong, Gwangju, Gyeonggi Province with the theme With K-Culture, collaborated K-pop and K-cultural asset; 2021 SBS Gayo Daejeon on December 25, which arranged in Christmas version, and additionally using canes, group dance, and parodying Squid Game's ttakji, and dalgona game; and 2021 MBC Gayo Daejejeon on December 31, adding ringing New Year's bell performance before New Year ceremony.

As an ambassador for the Korea Pavilion of Expo 2020, held at Dubai, United Arab Emirates, Stray Kids performed "Thunderous", as part of the opening show of the Korea Pavilion's Korea National Day with the Little Angels, and K-Tigers on January 17, 2022. The group also performed "Thunderous", alongside "Miroh", "God's Menu", and "Back Door" at the Korea National Day K-Pop Concert on the same day, joining Forestella, (G)I-dle, Golden Child, Sunmi, and Psy.

Stray Kids gave the debut performance of the Japanese version of "Thunderous" at CDTV Live! Live! on October 4, and, later, also performed on 35th anniversary special episode of Music Station on October 15, as well as Buzz Rhythm 02 on October 31. The Japanese version entered Billboard Japan Hot 100 at number 66.

== Track listing ==
All editions^{[a]} – CD, digital download, streaming
No.	Title	Lyrics	Music	Arrangement	Length
1.	"Scars"	Bang Chan (3Racha); Changbin (3Racha); Han (3Racha); KM-Markit	Armadillo; Bang Chan; Changbin; Han	Bang Chan; Versachoi	3:20
2.	"Thunderous" (ソリクン; Japanese version)	Bang Chan; Changbin; Han; KM-Markit	Bang Chan; Changbin; Han; HotSauce	HotSauce; Bang Chan	3:05
3.	"Call"	Han; KM-Markit	Bang Chan; Han	Bang Chan (3Racha)	2:47
Total length:					9:12

First press limited editions bonus track – CD
No.	Title	Lyrics	Music	Arrangement	Length
4.	"My Pace" (Japanese version)	Bang Chan; Changbin; Han; KM-Markit; J.Y. Park 'The Asiansoul'^{[b]}	Bang Chan; Changbin; Han; Earattack; Larmook	Earattack; Larmook; Gongdo	3:11
Total length:					12:23

First press limited editions A – Blu-ray
No.	Title	Length
1.	"Jacket Shooting Making Movie"

First press limited editions B – Blu-ray
No.	Title	Director(s)	Length
1.	"Thunderous" (Japanese version; performance music video)	Novvkim	3:09
2.	"Thunderous" (Japanese version; performance music video making movie)

Notes

- ^{^[a]} In first press limited edition B, "Thunderous" (Japanese version) is switched to be the first track, and "Scars" to be the second track.
- ^{^[b]} Signifies an additional lyricist
- "Call" is stylized in all caps

== Credits and personnel ==
Credits adapted from Melon and the Japanese CD single liner notes.

Locations

- Originally published at JYP Publishing (KOMCA), Sony Music Publishing (Japan) Inc. (Japanese version)
- Recorded at JYPE Studios (Seoul)
- Mixed at Chapel Swing Studios (Valley Glen)
- Mastered at 821 Sound Mastering (Seoul)

Personnel

- Stray Kids – lead vocals
  - Bang Chan (3Racha) – lyrics, composition, arrangement
  - Changbin (3Racha) – lyrics, composition
  - Han (3Racha) – lyrics, composition
  - KM-Markit – lyrics (Japanese version)
- HotSauce – composition, arrangement, keyboard, drum programming, computer programming, digital editing
- KayOne Lee – digital editing
- Lee Sang-yeob – recording
- Lim Hong-jin – recording (Korean version)
- Eom Se-hee – recording (Japanese version)
- Tony Maserati – mixing
- David K. Younghyun – mix engineering
- Kwon Nam-woo – mastering

== Accolades ==
"Thunderous" received six first place music program awards in South Korea. It received a nomination for Best Dance Performance – Male Group at the 2021 Mnet Asian Music Awards. "Thunderous" was named amongst the best K-pop songs of 2021 by Billboard (9th), Dazed (12th), Young Post (15th) and Tonplein (16th).

Music program awards for "Thunderous"
Program	Date	Ref.
Show Champion	September 1, 2021	
Show Champion	September 8, 2021	
M Countdown	September 2, 2021	
M Countdown	September 9, 2021	
Music Bank	September 3, 2021	
Inkigayo	September 5, 2021	

== Charts ==
=== Weekly charts ===
Chart performance
Chart (2021)	Peak position
Global 200 (Billboard)	80
Hungary (Single Top 40)	7
Japan Hot 100 (Billboard)	88
Malaysia (RIM)	14
Singapore (RIAS)	24
South Korea (Gaon)	33
South Korea (K-Pop 100)	90
UK Singles Sales (OCC)	82
US World Digital Song Sales (Billboard)	3

Chart performance (Japanese version)
Chart (2021)	Peak position
Belgian Albums (Ultratop Wallonia) Scars / Sorikun	160
Japan (Japan Hot 100)	66
Japan (Oricon) Scars / Thunderous (Japanese ver.)	2
Japan Combined Singles (Oricon) Scars / Thunderous (Japanese ver.)	2

=== Monthly charts ===
Monthly chart performance
Chart (2021)	Position
Japan (Oricon) Scars / Thunderous (Japanese ver.)	6
South Korea (Gaon)	135

=== Year-end charts ===
Year-end chart performance
Chart (2021)	Position
Japan Top Singles Sales (Billboard Japan) Scars / Thunderous (Japanese ver.)	43
Japan (Oricon) Scars / Thunderous (Japanese ver.)	52
South Korea Download (Gaon)	111

== Certifications and sales ==
Certifications and sales
Region	Certification	Certified units/sales
Japan (RIAJ) Scars / Thunderous (Japanese ver.) physical	Platinum	136,944
United States (RIAA)	Gold	500,000^{‡}
Streaming
Japan (RIAJ)	Gold	50,000,000^{†}
^{‡} Sales+streaming figures based on certification alone.^{†} Streaming-only figures based on certification alone.

== Release history ==
Release dates and formats
Region	Date	Format	Version	Label	Ref.
Various	August 23, 2021	Digital download; streaming	Original	JYP	
Various	September 23, 2021	Digital download; streaming	Japanese (pre-release)	Epic Japan	
Various	October 13, 2021	Digital download; streaming	Japanese	Epic Japan	
South Korea	October 13, 2021	Digital download; streaming	Japanese	JYP	
Japan	October 13, 2021	CD+Blu-ray	First press limited A	Epic Japan	
Japan	October 13, 2021	CD+Blu-ray	First press limited B	Epic Japan	
Japan	October 13, 2021	CD+SpecialZine	First press limited C	Epic Japan	
Japan	October 13, 2021	CD	Regular	Epic Japan	
Japan	October 13, 2021	CD	FC	Epic Japan	

== See also ==
- List of Inkigayo Chart winners (2021)
- List of M Countdown Chart winners (2021)
- List of Music Bank Chart winners (2021)
- List of Show Champion Chart winners (2021)
