= Kingdom: Legendary War =

2021 South Korean reality competition series

- Promotional poster
- Hangul: 킹덤: 레전더리 워
- RR: Kingdeom: rejeondeori wo
- MR: K'ingdŏm: rejŏndŏri wŏ
- Genre: Reality competition
- Directed by: Lee Young-joo
- Presented by: TVXQ
- Starring: BtoB; iKON; SF9; The Boyz; Stray Kids; Ateez
- Country of origin: South Korea
- Original language: Korean
- No. of episodes: 10

Production
- Running time: 90–120 minutes; 195 minutes (ep. 10)
- Production companies: CJ ENM; W Team

Original release
- Network: Mnet
- Release: April 1 – June 3, 2021

Related
- Queendom (2019); Road to Kingdom (2020); Queendom 2 (2022); Queendom Puzzle (2023); Road to Kingdom: Ace of Ace (2024)

Kingdom: Legendary War (Korean: 킹덤: 레전더리 워) is a television program that aired on Mnet beginning on April 1, 2021, and ending on June 3, 2021. It is known as the male counterpart of Queendom, and the sequel of Road to Kingdom. During the finale on June 3, 2021, Stray Kids won the program, finishing in 1st place.

== Overview ==
The program is a battle between six trending K-pop boy groups: BtoB, iKON, SF9, Ateez, The Boyz, Stray Kids.The program features four rounds of performances, with the final round being broadcast live.

The winner of the show, Stray Kids, was rewarded with a reality show specially for the winning boy group, plus a "Kingdom Week" special show.

== Promotion and broadcast ==
A preliminary competition, titled Road to Kingdom, aired from April 30 to June 18, 2020. The Boyz won the competition, securing a spot in Kingdom. On December 6, through the 2020 Mnet Asian Music Awards, the first lineup for Kingdom was announced, and it consisted of Road to Kingdom's winner The Boyz, alongside Stray Kids and Ateez.

On January 22, 2021, Mnet confirmed that the hosts of the show would be TVXQ. Six days after, the network confirmed that iKON, SF9, and BtoB would join the lineup.

On February 17, 2021, Mnet released the first trailer and announced a global live broadcast of the 100-second group introduction performances which is to be aired on February 23, 2021, via Mnet's YouTube channel.

On March 16, 2021, Mnet released performance posters and announced a special stage featuring members from each group that was shown during the March 18 episode of M Countdown.

The show was aired simulcast on Mnet Japan, AbemaTV in Japan and tvN Asia a day after the domestic broadcast.

The final episode aired live and was live streamed on Mnet's YouTube channel.

== Cast ==
=== Host ===
- Max Changmin (TVXQ) (Note: Originally hosted together with U-Know Yunho, due to a controversy the latter had stepped down from hosting the program. The production team would also edit out parts that were recorded with him, and Max Changmin would be the lone host for the rest of the program.)

=== Contestants ===
- BtoB (Note: Only the members that have promoted as BtoB 4U would participate due to the remaining members still undergoing military service.) (Note: Member Changsub was absent for the second round as he was feeling unwell.)
- IKon
- SF9 (Note: Member Rowoon didn't participate in the 100-second performances, and was absent for the first and third rounds due to his waist injury.)
- The Boyz (Note: Member Younghoon didn't participate in the third round due to his surgery.)
- Stray Kids (Note: Member Hyunjin was absent after the 100-second performances round due to his controversy that led to his hiatus.)
- Ateez (Note: Member Mingi was absent for the entire show due to his mental health hiatus that began back in November 2020, but he participated in the recording for the group's finale song "The Real".)

== Rules ==
The overall final ranking of the show is based on the following criteria:

1. Self-evaluation points (25%)
2. Experts' voting (25%)
3. Global voting (40%)
4. Performance video view count (10%)

=== Introduction Stage - 100 Second Performances ===
The six boy groups will each perform one of their hit songs (that have won 1st place in a music show) for a 100-second performance that will best express themselves.

- Except for the final performing boy group, which is decided by prior voting by the groups themselves of who they expect will win first place in this introductory stage. The first performing boy group is decided by the latter boy group who will themselves be performing last. After the first boy group has performed, they will decide on the second performing boy group, and the second boy group that has performed will then decide on the third performing boy group. The process goes on until the final boy group and all performances have been completed.
- The introduction performances will be streamed live through Mnet's YouTube channel on February 23, 2021. Voting via the Whosfan app for the round started after the live stream (from 20:15 (KST)) and closed on February 27, 2021, at 23:59 (KST). Viewers will vote for their top 3 performances.
- The winning boy group for this round will get 1,000 points, plus the benefit of arranging the cue sheet for the next round of performances.

=== Round 1 - To The World ===
The six boy groups each perform one (or two) of their representative hit songs, which are rearranged and different from their usual stages of the song.

- Voting via the Whosfan app for the round started from April 15 at 22:00 (KST) and closed on April 18 at 23:59 (KST). Viewers will vote for their top 3 performances.
- Experts' votes come from 30 professional judges, and each judge will have 3 votes to cast.
- For self-evaluation, each boy group will hold 3 votes, and will vote for other boy groups other than their own group.
- The winning boy group for this round will get 20,000 points.

=== Round 2 - Re-born ===
The six boy groups will exchange songs, perform and rearrange them into different styles.

- Voting via the Whosfan app for the round started from April 29 at 22:00 (KST) and closes on May 2 at 23:59 (KST). Viewers will vote for their top 3 performances.
- Views will only be counted for the first three days after the full versions of performances are released on Mnet's official YouTube channel.

=== Round 3 - No Limit ===
The premise of "No Limit" is that there are no restrictions for the performances in this round. A total of 40,000 points will be awarded in this round.

This round will be divided into two parts. The first parts involves the six individual groups being sorted into two larger teams (selected by Ateez, the highest scoring team in the previous round in terms of the total points in experts' votes plus self-evaluation). Each large team then divides its members into three smaller units - a dance unit, a vocal unit, and a rap unit, based on each individual idol's specialty. The corresponding units in each group will go against each other over three rounds - dance, vocal, and rap. The winning group in each of the three rounds will earn 5,000 points, which will be evenly distributed. The awarding of points is solely based on which group won each round. A total of 15,000 points are up for grabs.

The second part will be back in individual groups, with a total of 25,000 points to be distributed, in the same way as the other rounds. However, for the idol group's self-evaluations, each group can only vote for two teams, instead of three in previous rounds.

- For Part 1 of this round, 33 special judges are invited to judge the performances and each will have 1 vote. The special judges include Super Junior members Shindong & Donghae, producer and CEO of Brand New Music Rhymer, idol hitmaker Shinsadong Tiger, music critic Kim Young-dae, song production team MonoTree, choreographer Lia Kim and idol group members of BDC, Weeekly, Tri.be and Mirae.

=== Final Round - Who Is The King ===
The six boy groups will each perform a newly produced song live on the final episode. The new songs will be released digitally on May 28, 2021, at 12:00 (KST).

- Voting for this round includes live text votes for voters living in South Korea, and through Whosfan app for overseas fans.
- Digitals rankings will be determined via Gaon Music Chart for South Korea, and via Apple Music for overseas, from the time of release to June 1, 2021.

== Rounds ==
Introduction Stage - 100 Seconds Performance (Episode 1)
Order	Artist	Performance name	Global Votes	Ranking	Points	Note(s)
1	Ateez	Wave: Overture (Note: Based on their song "Wave".)	504,215	5th	0.000	The performances were aired via live stream on February 23, 2021, through Mnet's YouTube channel. Voting period was from February 23 to 27, and the results were announced during the first episode on April 1, 2021, for groups ranked 3 to 5. The groups ranked 1, 2, and 6 were revealed during the second episode on April 8, 2021.
2	BtoB	Beautiful Pain (Choir ver.)	540,621	3rd	0.000	The performances were aired via live stream on February 23, 2021, through Mnet's YouTube channel. Voting period was from February 23 to 27, and the results were announced during the first episode on April 1, 2021, for groups ranked 3 to 5. The groups ranked 1, 2, and 6 were revealed during the second episode on April 8, 2021.
3	SF9	Good Guy (The Glory) (Note: Based on their song "Good Guy".) (Note: Member Rowoon was seated as an audience member.)	533,458	4th	0.000	The performances were aired via live stream on February 23, 2021, through Mnet's YouTube channel. Voting period was from February 23 to 27, and the results were announced during the first episode on April 1, 2021, for groups ranked 3 to 5. The groups ranked 1, 2, and 6 were revealed during the second episode on April 8, 2021.
4	Stray Kids	Miroh	690,971	1st	1,000.000	The performances were aired via live stream on February 23, 2021, through Mnet's YouTube channel. Voting period was from February 23 to 27, and the results were announced during the first episode on April 1, 2021, for groups ranked 3 to 5. The groups ranked 1, 2, and 6 were revealed during the second episode on April 8, 2021.
5	The Boyz	The Stealer (Epic ver.) (Note: Based on "Game of Thrones".)	573,026	2nd	0.000	The performances were aired via live stream on February 23, 2021, through Mnet's YouTube channel. Voting period was from February 23 to 27, and the results were announced during the first episode on April 1, 2021, for groups ranked 3 to 5. The groups ranked 1, 2, and 6 were revealed during the second episode on April 8, 2021.
6	iKON	Rhythm Ta (Kingdom ver.) (Note: Including sample of "Hip Hop Gentlemen" by YG Family (1TYM, Jinusean, Masta Wu & G-Dragon.))	489,971	6th	0.000	The performances were aired via live stream on February 23, 2021, through Mnet's YouTube channel. Voting period was from February 23 to 27, and the results were announced during the first episode on April 1, 2021, for groups ranked 3 to 5. The groups ranked 1, 2, and 6 were revealed during the second episode on April 8, 2021.

Round 1 - To The World (Episode 2 & 3)
Order	Artist	Performance name	Experts' vote		Self-evaluation		YouTube views		Global voting		Total points	
1	The Boyz	No Air (A Song of Ice and Fire) (Note: Member Kevin participated in the performance, but could not perform the choreography due to an injury.)	3	1,000.000	4	833.333	5	Not Announced	6	Not Announced	3rd	3,142.066
2	iKON	Love Scenario & Killing Me (Kingdom ver.)	5	333.333	5	555.556	2	Not Announced	3	Not Announced	5th	2,747.719
3	BtoB	Missing You (Theatre ver.)	5	333.333	2	1,111.111	4	Not Announced	4	Not Announced	4th	2,969.431
4	Stray Kids	Jasin (Self's 'Character', Ghost 'God') (Note: 自神 (스스로 '자', 귀신 '신') in Korean and based on their songs "God's Menu" and "Side Effects".)	2	1,333.333	2	1,111.111	1	Not Announced	1	Not Announced	1st	4,679.776
5	Ateez	Symphony No.9 (From the Wonderland) (Note: Based on "Pirates of the Caribbean," "Symphony No. 9 (Dvořák)," and their song "Wonderland".)	1	1,555.556	1	1,388.889	3	Not Announced	5	Not Announced	2nd	4,418.537
6	SF9	Jealous (Note: Based on their song "Now or Never".)	4	444.444	6	0.000	6	Not Announced	2	Not Announced	6th	2,042.471

Round 2 - RE-BORN (Episodes 4 & 5)
Order	Artist	Performance name	Original Artist	Experts' vote		Self-evaluation		YouTube views		Global voting		Total points	
1	SF9	The Stealer (The Scene)	The Boyz	4	747.126	1	1,388.889	6	144.425	5	1,213.682	3rd	3494.122
2	The Boyz	O Sole Mio (The Red Wedding) (Note: Member Jacob participated in the performance, but could not perform the choreography due to an injury.)	SF9	2	919.540	4	0.000	4	291.483	2	1,323.199	6th	2,534.222
3	iKON	Inception (iKON ver.) (Note: Based on the movie entitled by the same name.)	Ateez	3	862.069	2	833.333	2	403.639	4	1,280.600	5th	3379.641
4	Ateez	Rhythm Ta (The Awakening of Summer) (Note: Based on a Spanish drama series Money Heist.)	iKON	1	1,321.839	2	833.333	3	305.001	6	1,146.890	1st	3607.063
5	BtoB	Back Door	Stray Kids	5	632.184	1	1,388.889	5	284.497	3	1,293.133	2nd	3598.704
6	Stray Kids	Pray (I'll Be Your Man) (Stray Kids ver.)	BtoB	6	517.241	3	555.556	1	570.954	1	1,742.497	4th	3386.248

Round 3 "No Limit" (Part 1) - Unit Round (Episodes 7 & 8)
Order	Unit	Artist	Performance name	Special Judges' votes	Total points	Ranking	Note(s)
Rap Units							The unit performances were evaluated by a total of 33 special judges who voted on-site to decide which unit won each round (rap, dance and vocal). The special judges include the Super Junior members Shindong & Donghae, producer and CEO of BNM Rhymer, idol hitmaker Shinsadong Tiger, music critic Kim Youngdae, production team MonoTree, choreographer Lia Kim and idol group members of BDC, Weeekly, Tri.be and Mirae.
1	It's One	Bobby (iKON); Sunwoo (The Boyz); Hwiyoung (SF9)	Full DaSH	10	0.000	2nd	The unit performances were evaluated by a total of 33 special judges who voted on-site to decide which unit won each round (rap, dance and vocal). The special judges include the Super Junior members Shindong & Donghae, producer and CEO of BNM Rhymer, idol hitmaker Shinsadong Tiger, music critic Kim Youngdae, production team MonoTree, choreographer Lia Kim and idol group members of BDC, Weeekly, Tri.be and Mirae.
2	Mayfly	Hongjoong (Ateez); Bang Chan, Changbin, Han (Stray Kids); Minhyuk (BtoB)	Colours (Note: 물감놀이) (Mulgamnori) in Korean.)	23	5,000.000	1st	The unit performances were evaluated by a total of 33 special judges who voted on-site to decide which unit won each round (rap, dance and vocal). The special judges include the Super Junior members Shindong & Donghae, producer and CEO of BNM Rhymer, idol hitmaker Shinsadong Tiger, music critic Kim Youngdae, production team MonoTree, choreographer Lia Kim and idol group members of BDC, Weeekly, Tri.be and Mirae.
Dance Units							The unit performances were evaluated by a total of 33 special judges who voted on-site to decide which unit won each round (rap, dance and vocal). The special judges include the Super Junior members Shindong & Donghae, producer and CEO of BNM Rhymer, idol hitmaker Shinsadong Tiger, music critic Kim Youngdae, production team MonoTree, choreographer Lia Kim and idol group members of BDC, Weeekly, Tri.be and Mirae.
3	It's One	Donghyuk (iKON); Juyeon (The Boyz); Taeyang (SF9)	King and Queen (Note: 王과 妃(왕과 비) in Korean.)	11	0.000	2nd	The unit performances were evaluated by a total of 33 special judges who voted on-site to decide which unit won each round (rap, dance and vocal). The special judges include the Super Junior members Shindong & Donghae, producer and CEO of BNM Rhymer, idol hitmaker Shinsadong Tiger, music critic Kim Youngdae, production team MonoTree, choreographer Lia Kim and idol group members of BDC, Weeekly, Tri.be and Mirae.
4	Mayfly	Lee Know, Felix, I.N (Stray Kids); Wooyoung, San, Yunho, Yeosang, Seonghwa (Ateez); Peniel (BtoB)	Wolf (Note: Originally by EXO)	22	5,000.000	1st	The unit performances were evaluated by a total of 33 special judges who voted on-site to decide which unit won each round (rap, dance and vocal). The special judges include the Super Junior members Shindong & Donghae, producer and CEO of BNM Rhymer, idol hitmaker Shinsadong Tiger, music critic Kim Youngdae, production team MonoTree, choreographer Lia Kim and idol group members of BDC, Weeekly, Tri.be and Mirae.
Vocal Units							The unit performances were evaluated by a total of 33 special judges who voted on-site to decide which unit won each round (rap, dance and vocal). The special judges include the Super Junior members Shindong & Donghae, producer and CEO of BNM Rhymer, idol hitmaker Shinsadong Tiger, music critic Kim Youngdae, production team MonoTree, choreographer Lia Kim and idol group members of BDC, Weeekly, Tri.be and Mirae.
5	It's One	Sangyeon, New (The Boyz); Inseong, Jaeyoon (SF9); Ju-ne, Jinhwan (iKON)	Spark (Note: Originally by Taeyeon (Girls' Generation))	0	0.000	2nd	The unit performances were evaluated by a total of 33 special judges who voted on-site to decide which unit won each round (rap, dance and vocal). The special judges include the Super Junior members Shindong & Donghae, producer and CEO of BNM Rhymer, idol hitmaker Shinsadong Tiger, music critic Kim Youngdae, production team MonoTree, choreographer Lia Kim and idol group members of BDC, Weeekly, Tri.be and Mirae.
6	Mayfly	Jongho (Ateez); Eunkwang (BtoB); Seungmin (Stray Kids)	Love Poem (Note: Originally by IU)	33	5,000.000	1st	The unit performances were evaluated by a total of 33 special judges who voted on-site to decide which unit won each round (rap, dance and vocal). The special judges include the Super Junior members Shindong & Donghae, producer and CEO of BNM Rhymer, idol hitmaker Shinsadong Tiger, music critic Kim Youngdae, production team MonoTree, choreographer Lia Kim and idol group members of BDC, Weeekly, Tri.be and Mirae.

Round 3 "No Limit" (Part 2) (Episodes 8 & 9)
Order	Artist	Song	Experts' vote		Self-evaluation		YouTube views (Est.)		Global voting (Est.)		Total points		Note(s)
1	iKON	"Classy Savage" (Note: Remake of Blackpink's "Pretty Savage".)	5	462.963	5	1504.630	2	946.292	2	1,627.792	3rd	4,078.717	Featuring Lisa of Blackpink
2	Stray Kids	"God's Ddu-Du Ddu-Du" (Note: 신뚜두뚜두 in Korean, based on their song "God's Menu" and Blackpink's "Ddu-Du Ddu-Du"; inspired by the movie Deadpool and contains also a reference to Ant-Man (film).)	1	2083.333	2	3125.000	1	1,020.614	1	2,853.615	1st	6,999.229	—
3	BtoB	"Blue Moon (Cinema Ver)" (Note: inspired by the movie La La Land & Once Upon a Time in Hollywood.)	4	578.704	3	2141.204	5	115.286	6	1,057.817	5th	3,314.303	Special Guest: Miyeon of (G)I-DLE
4	Ateez	"Answer: Ode To Joy" (Note: Included sample of Ode an die Freude by Ludwig van Beethoven, sung by La Poem.)	5	462.963	6	462.963	3	187.738	4	1,520.762	6th	2,171.463	Featuring La Poem
5	SF9	"Move" (Note: Originally by Taemin (SHINee))	2	1851.852	1	3414.352	6	84.995	3	1,555.675	2nd	5,055.020	—
6	The Boyz	"Monster (Stormborn)" (Note: Originally by EXO) (Note: Member Younghoon was seated backstage as an audience member.)	3	810.185	4	1851.852	4	145.075	5	1,384.333	4th	3,381.268	—

Finale Live Comeback Stages "Who Is The King" (Episode 10)
Order	Artist	Song	Digitals (40%)		Live Voting (60%)		Total Points	
1	Ateez	"The Real" (멋)	4	2,029.845	3	4,071.198	3rd	6,101.043
2	Stray Kids	"Wolfgang"	2	4,509.424	1	13,298.363	1st	17,807.787
3	The Boyz	"Kingdom Come" (Note: Members Younghoon and Ju Hak-nyeon were present for the performance, but did not perform the choreography due to their respective health issues.)	1	8,345.829	2	6,560.112	2nd	14,905.941
4	BtoB	"Finale (Show and Prove)" (피날레 (Show And Prove))	3	2,724.731	4	2,669.953	4th	5,394.683
5	iKON	"At Ease" (열중쉬어)	5	1,716.103	5	1,953.708	5th	3,669.811
6	SF9	"Believer" (숨)	6	674.068	6	1,446.667	6th	2,120.735
Special Performance
King's Voice (Note: Consists of Eunkwang (BtoB), Donghyuk (iKON), Inseong (SF9), Hyunjae (The Boyz), Seungmin (Stray Kids) and Jongho (Ateez))		"A Boy's Diary" (소년의 일기)	—N/a					

Points Summary
Rank	Artist	Introduction Stage (1,000 points)		Round 1 (20,000 points)		Round 2 (20,000 points)		Round 3 (40,000 points)				Final Round (50,000 points)		Overall Points
Rank	Artist	Introduction Stage (1,000 points)		Round 1 (20,000 points)		Round 2 (20,000 points)		Part 1 (15,000)		Part 2 (25,000)		Final Round (50,000 points)		Overall Points
1st	Stray Kids	1	1,000.000	1	4,679.776	4	3,386.248	1	5,000.000	1	6,999.229	1	17,807.787	38,873.040
2nd	The Boyz	2	0.000	3	3,142.066	6	2,534.222	4	0.000	4	3,381.268	2	14,905.941	23,963.497
3rd	Ateez	5	0.000	2	4,418.537	1	3,607.063	1	5,000.000	6	2,171.463	3	6,101.043	21,298.106
4th	BtoB	3	0.000	4	2,969.431	2	3,598.704	1	5,000.000	5	3,314.303	4	5,394.683	20,277.121
5th	iKON	6	0.000	5	2,747.719	5	3,379.641	4	0.000	3	4,078.717	5	3,669.811	13,875.888
6th	SF9	4	0.000	6	2,042.471	3	3,494.122	4	0.000	2	5,055.020	6	2,120.735	12,712.348

Point Accumulation
Rank	Artist	After Introduction Stage		After Round 1		After Round 2		After Round 3				After Final Round (Total)	
Rank	Artist	After Introduction Stage		After Round 1		After Round 2		Part 1		Part 2		After Final Round (Total)	
1st	Stray Kids	1	1,000.000	1	5,679.776	1	9066.024	1	14066.024	1	21065.253	1	38,873.040
2nd	The Boyz	2	0.000	3	3,142.066	5	5676.288	5	5576.288	6	9057.556	2	23,963.497
3rd	Ateez	5	0.000	2	4,418.537	2	8025.600	2	13025.600	2	15197.063	3	21,298.106
4th	BtoB	3	0.000	4	2,969.431	3	6568.135	3	11568.135	3	14882.438	4	20,277.121
5th	iKON	6	0.000	5	2,747.719	4	6127.360	4	6127.360	5	10206.077	5	13,875.888
6th	SF9	4	0.000	6	2,042.471	6	5536.593	6	6127.360	4	10591.613	6	12,712.348

== Discography ==
=== Kingdom <Re-Born> Part 1 ===
Released on April 23, 2021
No.	Title	Lyrics	Music	Performer	Length
1.	"The Stealer (The Scene)"	Kenzie; Sunwoo	Coach & Sendo; Theo Lawrence; Yuki; (Note: Arranged by Park Soo-seok and Seo Ji-eun)	SF9	4:27
2.	"O Sole Mio (The Red Wedding)" (오솔레미오 (The Red Wedding))	CR Kim; Young Bae	CR Kim; Young Bae; (Note: Arranged by Nmore (Prismfilter), Ohway! (Prismfilter) and Glenn (Prismfilter))	The Boyz	3:31
Total length:					7:58

=== Kingdom <No Limit> ===
Released on May 28, 2021
No.	Title	Lyrics	Music	Performer	Length
1.	"Move"	Seo Ji-eum	Curtis Richardson; Adien Lewis; Angélique Cinélu	SF9	4:37
Total length:					4:37

=== Kingdom <Finale: Who Is the King?> ===
Released on May 28, 2021
No.	Title	Lyrics	Music	Performer	Length
1.	"Finale (Show and Prove)" (피날레 (Show And Prove))	Minhyuk (Huta); Peniel	Minhyuk (Huta); Aftrshok (Note: Also signifies an arranger); Joseph K; The Muze	BtoB	4:00
2.	"At Ease" (열중쉬어)	Bobby; Mino	Mino; Future Bounce	iKON	3:30
3.	"Believer" (숨 (Note: Stylized as "숨 |Believer|"))	Han Sung-ho; Youngbin; Zuho; Hwiyoung; Chani	Daniel Kim; Willie Weeks	SF9	3:32
4.	"Kingdom Come"	Jo Yoon-kyung	Albi Albertsson; Yuka Otsuki; Fabian Strandberg; Hautboi Rich	The Boyz	3:46
5.	"Wolfgang"	Bang Chan (3Racha); Changbin (3Racha); Han (3Racha)	Bang Chan (3Racha); Changbin (3Racha); Han (3Racha); Versachoi	Stray Kids	3:11
6.	"The Real" (멋)	Eden; Ollounder; Leez; Peperoni; Oliv; Hongjoong; Mingi	Eden; Ollounder; Leez; Peperoni; Oliv	Ateez	3:11
Total length:					21:08

=== Chart performance ===
Title	Year	Peak chart positions						Remarks
Title	Year	KOR	KOR Hot	HUN	MYS	US World	WW Excl. US	Remarks
"Move"	2021	— (Note: "Move" did not enter Gaon Digital Chart, but debuted and peaked at number 145 on Gaon Download Chart.)	—	—	—	—	—	Kingdom: No Limit
"Finale (Show and Prove)"	2021	134	94	—	—	—	—	Kingdom <Finale: Who Is the King?>
"At Ease"	2021	— (Note: "At Ease" did not enter Gaon Digital Chart, but debuted and peaked at number 14 on Gaon Download Chart.)	—	—	—	—	—	Kingdom <Finale: Who Is the King?>
"Believer"	2021	— (Note: "Believer" did not enter Gaon Digital Chart, but debuted and peaked at number 37 on Gaon Download Chart.)	59	—	—	—	—	Kingdom <Finale: Who Is the King?>
"Kingdom Come"	2021	37	7	—	—	—	—	Kingdom <Finale: Who Is the King?>
"Wolfgang"	2021	138	53	—	6	4	109	Kingdom <Finale: Who Is the King?>
"The Real"	2021	— (Note: "The Real" did not enter Gaon Digital Chart, but debuted and peaked at number 17 on Gaon Download Chart.)	—	40	—	6	—	Kingdom <Finale: Who Is the King?>
"—" denotes releases that did not chart or were not released in that region.

== Ratings ==
In the ratings below, the highest rating for the show will be in red and the lowest rating for the show will be in blue.

Average TV viewership ratings
Ep.	Original broadcast date	Average audience share
Ep.	Original broadcast date	Nielsen Korea (Nationwide)
1	April 1, 2021	0.284% (171st)
2	April 8, 2021	0.458% (68th)
3	April 15, 2021	0.239% (211th)
4	April 22, 2021	0.485% (71st)
5	April 29, 2021	0.463% (75th)
6	May 6, 2021	0.369% (120th)
7	May 13, 2021	0.286% (176th)
8	May 20, 2021	0.455% (88th)
9	May 27, 2021	0.422% (93rd)
10	June 3, 2021	0.507% (65th)

== Controversy ==
On March 29, 2021, controversy arose following the reports from industry representatives of an issue in the midst of recording performances during round one. Each group were notified the maximum budget for stage decoration would be ₩5 million won (approximately $4,416) per team. However, during the recording, agencies from groups who comparatively did not have an extravagant set and props that appeared to be far over the budget reportedly confronted the production team on the matter and questioned if it was due to CJ ENM investing in the other group's agency. According to the report, the production team countered by stating it was because the group's props were from their concert, but as the other groups have also had concerts with props that could've been used, their agencies continued to speak out.

In response, during the press conference held on April 1, CP Park Chan-wook stated: "I apologize that an issue was raised ahead of the show's premiere. But we did not have to halt the recording due to someone's complaint. There was also no favoritism towards a certain team. I hope that the six teams and their agencies were not harmed by this issue. For round two, we had discussions with each agency about the parts that were lacking in round one. We have all negotiated and agreed on a way to bring out each team's creatives well. Starting round three, with the conditions that all six teams have agreed on, we will make sure that there are no more issues like these."

== Song Credits ==
Names of performing members that have also contributed to the songwriting will be highlighted in bold. The information below is detailed according to the songwriting credits available on the respective full performance videos uploaded on Mnet's official YouTube channel.

Name of performance, featured performers, lyricist, composer, arranger, relevant notes as credited on Mnet's YouTube uploads
Round	Performance	Original Song(s)	Artist(s)	Lyrics	Composition	Arrangement	Notes
Introduction Stage	"WAVE : Overture"	Wave (2019)	Ateez	EDEN; LEEZ; BUDDY; **Hongjoong (Ateez)**; Mingi (Ateez)	EDEN; LEEZ; BUDDY	EDEN; LEEZ	
Introduction Stage	"Beautiful Pain (Choir Ver.)"	Beautiful Pain (2018)	BtoB	Hyunsik (BtoB) and 4 others	Hyunsik (BtoB) and 1 other	MosPick	
Introduction Stage	"Good Guy (The Glory)"	Good Guy (2020)	SF9	Han Seong-ho; **Youngbin (SF9)**; **Hwiyoung (SF9)**	Daniel Kim; Takey; Al Swettenham	SlyBerry; DJ Kayvon	
Introduction Stage	"Miroh"	Miroh (2019)	Stray Kids	**Bang Chan (3RACHA)**; **Changbin (3RACHA)**; **Han (3RACHA)**	**Bang Chan (3RACHA)**; **Changbin (3RACHA)**; **Han (3RACHA)**; Brian Atwood	**Bang Chan (3RACHA)**; **Changbin (3RACHA)**; **Han (3RACHA)**; Brian Atwood; VERSACHOI	
Introduction Stage	"The Stealer (Epic Ver.)"	The Stealer (2020)	The Boyz	KENZIE; **Sunwoo (The Boyz)**	Coach & Sendo; Theo Lawrence; Yuki	Tak & 1Take	
Introduction Stage	"Rhythm Ta (Kingdom Ver.)"	Rhythm Ta (2015)	iKON	B.I; **BOBBY (iKON)**; YG Family	P.K (FUTURE BOUNCE); B.I; **Ju-ne (iKON)**; TEDDY	FUTURE BOUNCE	
Round 1: To The World	"No Air (A Song of Ice and Fire)"	No Air (2018)	The Boyz	Ryodo; **Sunwoo (The Boyz)**	Nmore (PRISMFILTER)	Wonderkid; Ryodo	
Round 1: To The World	"Love Scenario & Killing Me (KINGDOM Ver.)"	Love Scenario (2018); Killing Me (2018)	iKON	B.I; **BOBBY (iKON)**; Mot Mal	B.I; MILLENNIUM; Seung; Joe Rhee; R.Tee	FUTURE BOUNCE	
Round 1: To The World	"Missing You (Theatre Ver.)"	Missing You (2017)	BtoB	Hyunsik (BtoB); EDEN; **Minhyuk/HUTA (BtoB)**; Ilhoon; **Peniel (BtoB)**	Hyunsik (BtoB); EDEN	MosPick	
Round 1: To The World	" 自神 (스스로 '자', 귀신 '신') "	Side Effects (2019); God's Menu (2020)	Stray Kids	**Bang Chan (3RACHA)** and 4 others	**Bang Chan (3RACHA)** and 1 other	**Bang Chan (3RACHA)** and 3 others	
Round 1: To The World	"Symphony No.9 (From the Wonderland)"	Wonderland (2019)	Ateez	EDEN and 6 others	EDEN and 3 others	EDEN and 5 others	Arrangement includes samples of "Symphony No.9 From the New World" by Dvořák.
Round 1: To The World	"Jealous"	Now or Never (2018)	SF9	Han Seong-ho; Park Ji-yeon; Koo Ji-eun; Alex	Daniel Kim; Al Swettenham	Park Soo Seok; Seo Ji-eun	
Round 2: RE-BORN	"The Stealer (The Scene)"	The Stealer (2019) by The Boyz	SF9	Kenzie; **Sunwoo (The Boyz)**	Coach & Sendo; Theo Lawrence; Yuki	Park Soo Seok; Seo Ji-eun	
Round 2: RE-BORN	"O Sole Mio (The Red Wedding)"	O Sole Mio (2017) by SF9	The Boyz	CR KIM; Young Bae	CR KIM; Young Bae	Nmore (PRISMFILTER); Ohway! (PRISMFILTER); Glenn (PRISMFILTER)	Arrangement includes samples of "El Tango de Roxanne" ('Moulin Rouge' Soundtrack), "Erlkönig" by Schubert.
Round 2: RE-BORN	"INCEPTION (iKON Ver.)"	Inception (2020) by Ateez	iKON	EDEN; LEEZ; Ollounder; BUDDY; Hongjoong (Ateez); Mingi (Ateez); **BOBBY (iKON)**	EDEN; LEEZ; Ollounder; BUDDY	FUTURE BOUNCE; MINO	
Round 2: RE-BORN	"Rhythm Ta (The Awakening of Summer)"	Rhythm Ta (2015) by iKON	Ateez	B.I BOBBY (iKON); **Hongjoong (Ateez)**	P.K B.I Ju-ne (iKON)	EDEN; LEEZ; Ollounder; BUDDY; Peperoni; Oliy	Arrangement includes samples of "Vivaldi : Four Seasons – Summer (L'Estate). 3."
Round 2: RE-BORN	"Back Door"	Back Door (2020) by Stray Kids	BtoB	Bang Chan (3RACHA); Changbin (3RACHA); Han (3RACHA); **Minhyuk/HUTA (BtoB)**; **Peniel Shin (BtoB)**	Bang Chan (3RACHA); Changbin (3RACHA); Han (3RACHA); HotSauce	Seo Jae Woo; Siixk Jun	
Round 2: RE-BORN	"Pray (I'll Be Your Man) (Stray Kids Ver.)"	Pray (I'll Be Your Man) (2016) by BtoB	Stray Kids	Hyunsik (BtoB); Minhyuk/HUTA (BtoB); Peniel Shin (BtoB); Ilhoon (BtoB); **Bang Chan (3RACHA)**; **Changbin (3RACHA)**; **Han (3RACHA)**; **Felix (Stray Kids)**	Hyunsik (BtoB); EDEN; NATHAN	VERSACHOI; **Bang Chan (3RACHA)**	
Round 3: Part 1	"Full DaSH"	(NEW)	IT'S ONE Rap Unit	**BOBBY (iKON)**; **Sunwoo (The Boyz)**; **Hwiyoung (SF9)**	**BOBBY (iKON)**; MILLENIUM; NATHAN	MILLENIUM; NATHAN	
Round 3: Part 1	"Paint" (물감놀이)	(NEW)	MAYFLY Rap Unit	**Bang Chan (3RACHA)**; **Changbin (3RACHA)**; **Han (3RACHA)**; **Minhyuk/HUTA (BtoB)**; **Hongjoong (Ateez)**	**Bang Chan (3RACHA)**; **Changbin (3RACHA)**; **Han (3RACHA)**; **Minhyuk/HUTA (BtoB)**; **Hongjoong (Ateez)**	**Bang Chan (3RACHA)**; VERSACHOI; **Hongjoong (Ateez)**	
Round 3: Part 2	"Blue Moon (Cinema Ver.)"	Blue Moon (2018)	BtoB	**Minhyuk/HUTA (BtoB)**; **Peniel Shin (BtoB)**; Ilhoon	**Minhyuk/HUTA (BtoB)**; AFTRSHOK; Joseph K	AFTRSHOK; GEIST WAY	
Final Round: Who Is The King	"The Real" (멋)	(NEW)	Ateez	EDEN; Ollounder; LEEZ; Peperoni; Oliv; **Hongjoong (Ateez)**; **Mingi (Ateez)**	EDEN; Ollounder; LEEZ; Peperoni; Oliv	EDEN; Ollounder; LEEZ; Peperoni; Oliv	
Final Round: Who Is The King	"Wolfgang"	(NEW)	Stray Kids	**Bang Chan (3RACHA)**; **Changbin (3RACHA)**; **Han (3RACHA)**	**Bang Chan (3RACHA)**; **Changbin (3RACHA)**; **Han (3RACHA)**; Versachoi	**Bang Chan (3RACHA)**; Versachoi	Intro: W.A.Mozart - Symphony No.40
Final Round: Who Is The King	"Kingdom Come"	(NEW)	The Boyz	Jo Yoon-kyung	Albi Albertsson; Yuka Otsuki; Fabian Strandberg; Hautboi Rich	TBA	
Final Round: Who Is The King	"Finale (Show and Prove) (피날레 (Show And Prove))"	(NEW)	BtoB	**Minhyuk/HUTA (BtoB)**; **Peniel (BtoB)**	**Minhyuk/HUTA (BtoB)**; AFTRSHOK; Joseph K The muze	AFTRSHOK; Joseph K	
Final Round: Who Is The King	"At Ease" (열중쉬어)	(NEW)	iKON	**BOBBY (iKON)**; MINO	MINO; Future Bounce	Future Bounce	
Final Round: Who Is The King	"Believer" (숨)	(NEW)	SF9	Han Sung-ho, **Youngbin (SF9)**, **Zuho (SF9)**, **Hwiyoung (SF9)**, **Chani (SF9)**	Daniel Kim; Willie Weeks	Willie Weeks	
