= List of Tower of God episodes =

Promotional poster for the first season of the series

Tower of God (Japanese: 神之塔 -Tower of God-, Hepburn: Kami no Tō -Tawā obu Goddo-) is an anime television series based on S.I.U.'s manhwa series of the same name. The anime adaptation was initially announced at Seoul Comic-Con in August 2019. The series premiered in April 2020 simultaneously in the countries of Japan, South Korea, and the United States. The first season was produced by Telecom Animation Film, with Aniplex subsidiary Rialto Entertainment responsible for Japanese production, and Sola Entertainment providing production management. The series premiered on April 1, 2020, on South Korea's Naver Series On and television network Aniplus, and in Japan from April 2 to June 24, 2020, on Tokyo MX and other networks. (Note: The first two episodes received an early release on Naver Series On at 20:00 KST April 1 and 8, 2020. Subsequent Korean-dubbed episodes premiered at 23:00 KST, and subsequent Japanese-dubbed episodes aired at 24:30 JST, which is effectively 00:30 JST the following day.) The season was directed by Takashi Sano, with Hirokazu Hanai as assistant director, Erika Yoshida in series composition, Masashi Kudo and Miho Tanino in character designs, and Kevin Penkin composed the soundtrack. The opening theme song is "Top", while the ending theme song is "Slump"; both performed by the K-pop band Stray Kids in Japanese, English, and Korean for the respective language dubs.

Crunchyroll streamed the Japanese broadcast of the series as a co-production under its "Crunchyroll Originals" label. Viz Media licensed the series for home video distribution in North America and released it on Blu-ray on January 18, 2022.

In August 2022, during their industry panel at Crunchyroll Expo, Crunchyroll announced that a second season was in production. It is produced by The Answer Studio and directed by Akira Suzuki, with Kazuyoshi Takeuchi serving as chief director. The season premiered on July 7, 2024, and is airing in two consecutive story arc cours. For the first cours covering the "Return of the Prince" story arc, the opening theme song is "Rise Up", while the ending theme song is "Believe"; both are performed by NiziU. For the second cours covering the "Workshop Battle" story arc, the opening theme song is "Night", while the ending theme song is "Falling Up"; both are performed by Stray Kids.

== Series overview ==
| Season | Episodes | | Originally released | |
| Season | Episodes | | First released | Last released |
|---|---|---|---|---|
| 1 | 13 | | April 1, 2020 | June 24, 2020 |
| 2 | 26 | 13 | July 7, 2024 | September 29, 2024 |
| 2 | 26 | 13 | October 6, 2024 | December 29, 2024 |

== Episodes ==
=== Season 1 (2020) ===
Note: All episodes from this season were written by Erika Yoshida

| No. overall | No. in season | Title | Directed by | Storyboarded by | Chief animation directed by | Original release date |
|---|---|---|---|---|---|---|
| 1 | 1 | "Ball" (Note: Stylized in all caps) | Takashi Sano | Takashi Sano | Miho Tanino | April 1, 2020 |
| 2 | 2 | "3/400"; Transliteration: "Yonhyaku-bun no San" (Japanese: 400分の3) | Hirokazu Hanai | Hirokazu Hanai | Miho Tanino | April 8, 2020 |
| 3 | 3 | "The Correct Door"; Transliteration: "Seikai no Tobira" (Japanese: 正解の扉) | Rokusuke Okimitsu | Takashi Sano | Miho Tanino | April 15, 2020 |
| 4 | 4 | "The Green April"; Transliteration: "Midori no Shigatsu" (Japanese: 緑の四月) | Masahiko Murata | Masahiko Murata | Miho Tanino | April 22, 2020 |
| 5 | 5 | "The Crown's Fate"; Transliteration: "Okan no Yukue" (Japanese: 王冠の行方) | Yasuro Tsuchiya | Hirokazu Hanai | Miho Tanino | April 29, 2020 |
| 6 | 6 | "Position Selection"; Transliteration: "Pojishon Wake" (Japanese: ポジション分け) | Hiroaki Kudō | Takashi Sano | Miho Tanino | May 6, 2020 |
| 7 | 7 | "Lunch and Tag"; Transliteration: "Gohan to Onigokko" (Japanese: ご飯と鬼ごっこ) | Juria Matsumura | Takashi Sano | Kensuke Ishikawa | May 13, 2020 |
| 8 | 8 | "Khun's Strategy"; Transliteration: "Kun no Sakuryaku" (Japanese: クンの策略) | Hikaru Sato | Hirokazu Hanai | Miho Tanino | May 20, 2020 |
| 9 | 9 | "The One-Horned Ogre"; Transliteration: "Katakaku no Oni" (Japanese: 片角の鬼) | Yuichiro Yano | Takashi Sano | Miho Tanino | May 27, 2020 |
| 10 | 10 | "Beyond the Sadness"; Transliteration: "Kanashimi no Saki ni" (Japanese: 悲しみの先に) | Yasuro Tsuchiya | Takashi Sano | Miho Tanino | June 3, 2020 |
| 11 | 11 | "Underwater Hunt (Part 1)"; Transliteration: "Sengyo Kari (Zenpen)" (Japanese: 潜魚狩り (前編)) | Kanji Miyake | Takashi Sano | Miho Tanino & Kensuke Ishikawa | June 10, 2020 |
| 12 | 12 | "Underwater Hunt (Part 2)"; Transliteration: "Sengyo Kari (Kōhen)" (Japanese: 潜魚狩り (後編)) | Hirokazu Hanai | Hirokazu Hanai | Miho Tanino & Kensuke Ishikawa | June 17, 2020 |
| 13 | 13 | "Tower of God"; Transliteration: "Kami no Tō" (Japanese: 神之塔) | Takashi Sano & Masahiko Murata | Takashi Sano | Miho Tanino & Minoko Takasu | June 24, 2020 |

=== Season 2 (2024) ===
| No. overall | No. in season | Title | Directed by | Written by | Storyboarded by (Note: Production staff information is taken from the ending credits of each episode.) | Original release date |
|---|---|---|---|---|---|---|
Return of the Prince
| 14 | 1 | "Last Chance" | Yoshitsugu Kimura | Erika Yoshida | Toshihiko Masuda | July 7, 2024 |
| 15 | 2 | "The Strongest Regular"; Transliteration: "Saikyō no Senbetsu-sha" (Japanese: 最強の選別者) | Taiki Nishimura | Erika Yoshida | Namako Umino | July 14, 2024 |
| 16 | 3 | "The Trustworthy Room"; Transliteration: "Shinji Rareru Heya" (Japanese: 信じられる部屋) | Tsutomu Murakami | Erika Yoshida | Tsutomu Murakami | July 21, 2024 |
| 17 | 4 | "Ramen and the Great Big Sky"; Transliteration: "Rāmen to Hiroi Sora" (Japanese: ラーメンと広い空) | Michita Shiraishi | Takeshi Miyamoto | Kei Suzuki | July 28, 2024 |
| 18 | 5 | "The Other Team"; Transliteration: "Mō Hitotsu no Chīmu" (Japanese: もうひとつのチーム) | Makoto Ōga | Erika Yoshida | Masayoshi Nishida | August 4, 2024 |
| 19 | 6 | "Zygaena's Flower"; Transliteration: "Chigena no Hana" (Japanese: チゲナの花) | Shintaro Noro | Takeshi Miyamoto | Masayoshi Nishida | August 11, 2024 |
| 20 | 7 | "Mazino Magic"; Transliteration: "Maji no Majikku" (Japanese: マジノマジック) | Shige Fukase | Takeshi Miyamoto | Toshihiko Masuda | August 18, 2024 |
| 21 | 8 | "Her Name Is Emily"; Transliteration: "Kanojo no Nawa Emirī" (Japanese: 彼女の名はエミリー) | Taiki Nishimura | Riuji Yoshizaki | Daisuke Kurose | August 25, 2024 |
| 22 | 9 | "One-Winged Devil"; Transliteration: "Hen'yoku no Akuma" (Japanese: 片翼の悪魔) | Tsutomu Murakami | Takeshi Miyamoto | Toshikatsu Tokoro | September 1, 2024 |
| 23 | 10 | "The Hand of Arlen"; Transliteration: "Aruren no Te" (Japanese: アルレンの手) | Taro Yamada | Riuji Yoshizaki | Masayoshi Nishida | September 8, 2024 |
| 24 | 11 | "A Thick and Distant Wall"; Transliteration: "Atsukute Tōi Kabe" (Japanese: 厚くて遠い壁) | Yoshitsugu Kimura | Riuji Yoshizaki | Toshihiko Masuda | September 15, 2024 |
| 25 | 12 | "A New Trial"; Transliteration: "Aratana Shiren" (Japanese: 新たな試練) | Shige Fukase | Takeshi Miyamoto | Namako Umino | September 22, 2024 |
| 26 | 13 | "Archimedes"; Transliteration: "Arukimedesu" (Japanese: アルキメデス) | Masahiro Takada | Takeshi Miyamoto | Shigenori Kageyama | September 29, 2024 |
Workshop Battle
| 27 | 14 | "Meeting the Traveler"; Transliteration: "Tabibito to no Deai" (Japanese: 旅人との出会い) | Kazuya Fujishiro | Riuji Yoshizaki | Masayoshi Nishida | October 6, 2024 |
| 28 | 15 | "The Promise of That Day"; Transliteration: "Ano-hi no Yakusoku" (Japanese: あの日の約束) | Tsutomu Murakami | Erika Yoshida | Toshihiko Masuda | October 13, 2024 |
| 29 | 16 | "The 25th Bam"; Transliteration: "Nijūgonichi no Yoru" (Japanese: 二十五日の夜) | Taiki Nishimura | Takeshi Miyamoto | Takaaki Ishiyama | October 20, 2024 |
| 30 | 17 | "Funky!"; Transliteration: "Fankī!" (Japanese: ファンキー！) | Yoshitsugu Kimura | Riuji Yoshizaki | Namako Umino | October 27, 2024 |
| 31 | 18 | "The Mad Dog and the Lizard"; Transliteration: "Kyōken to Tokage" (Japanese: 狂犬とトカゲ) | Taro Tanaka | Takeshi Miyamoto | Masayoshi Nishida | November 3, 2024 |
| 32 | 19 | "All In" | Yoshihiko Mori & Xu Chenyin | Riuji Yoshizaki | You Nakano | November 10, 2024 |
| 33 | 20 | "Like a Flame in the Wind"; Transliteration: "Fūzen no Tomoshibi" (Japanese: 風前の灯火) | Hideaki Uehara | Takeshi Miyamoto | Toshihiko Masuda | November 17, 2024 |
| 34 | 21 | "The Beginning of Dawn"; Transliteration: "Yoake no Hajimari" (Japanese: 夜明けのはじまり) | Shigeki Awai | Riuji Yoshizaki | Shigenori Kageyama | November 24, 2024 |
| 35 | 22 | "Their Workshop"; Transliteration: "Futari no Kōbō" (Japanese: ふたりのこうぼう) | Naoki Murata | Takeshi Miyamoto | Masayoshi Nishida | December 1, 2024 |
| 36 | 23 | "The End of Dawn"; Transliteration: "Yoake no Owari" (Japanese: 夜明けの終わり) | Manpuku Ōtsuka | Riuji Yoshizaki | Shigenori Kageyama | December 8, 2024 |
| 37 | 24 | "The Cost of Battle"; Transliteration: "Tatakai no Daishō" (Japanese: 戦いの代償) | Taro Tanaka & Kei Suzuki | Riuji Yoshizaki | Toshihiko Masuda | December 15, 2024 |
| 38 | 25 | "Return of the King"; Transliteration: "Ōnokikan" (Japanese: 王の帰還) | Toshikatsu Tokoro | Takeshi Miyamoto | Toshikatsu Tokoro | December 22, 2024 |
| 39 | 26 | "The Dawn of the Departure"; Transliteration: "Tabidachi no Yoake" (Japanese: 旅立ちの夜明け) | Hideaki Uehara | Erika Yoshida | Namako Umino | December 29, 2024 |
