= Noblesse (manhwa) =

South Korean webtoon

- Cover of Noblesse volume 1 featuring Rai

노블레스 RR: Nobeulleseu MR: Nobŭllesŭ
- Genre: Dark fantasy
- Author: Son Je-ho
- Illustrator: Lee Kwangsu
- Webtoon service: Naver Webtoon (Korean); Line Webtoon (English)
- Original run: 2007–2019
- Volumes: 25
- Original net animation

Noblesse: Awakening
- Directed by: Shunsuke Tada (chief); Kenichi Matsuzawa
- Written by: Shun Fukudome
- Music by: Yoshihiro Ike
- Studio: Production I.G
- Licensed by: Crunchyroll; NA: Sentai Filmworks (home video); SEA: Muse Communication
- Released: February 4, 2016
- Runtime: 31 minutes
- Anime television series
- Directed by: Shunsuke Tada (chief); Yasutaka Yamamoto
- Written by: Sayaka Harada
- Music by: Yoshihiro Ike; Shun Narita
- Studio: Production I.G
- Licensed by: Crunchyroll; NA: Sentai Filmworks (home video); SEA: Muse Communication
- Original network: Tokyo MX, BS 11
- Original run: October 7, 2020 – December 30, 2020
- Episodes: 13

Noblesse (Korean: 노블레스) is a South Korean manhwa released as a webtoon, written by Son Je-ho and illustrated by Lee Kwangsu. Noblesse was first posted on Naver Corporation's webtoon platform, Naver Webtoon, in December 2007 and concluded in January 2019. It was among the first webtoons to receive an official English translation at the launch of Line Webtoon in July 2014. The series has been adapted into an aeni in 2015, an original net animation (ONA) in 2016, and an anime television series by Production I.G that aired from October to December 2020 on Crunchyroll.

== Plot ==
A powerful noble, Cadis Etrama Di Raizel (referred to as Rai), has been asleep for 820 years with no knowledge of mankind's advancement and scientific successes. At the start of the webtoon, Rai wakes up in an abandoned building in South Korea, and starts to get used to the modern world. He goes to a school, where he reunites with his loyal servant Frankenstein. With Frankenstein's help, Rai enrolls into high school and inadvertently befriends athletic teenager Shinwoo, computer geek Ikhan, and Shinwoo's crush Yuna, and a few others. Noblesse follows the group's often dangerous adventures against a secret organization while uncovering Rai's past.

== Characters ==
Cadis Etrama Di Raizel (a.k.a. Rai)
Voiced by: Shin YongWoo (2015 animation) (Korean); Tarusuke Shingaki (ONA & anime) (Japanese); Ray Chase (English)
A Noble from Lukedonia who holds the special title of Noblesse, which distinguishes him from all other Nobles as their hidden protector, their judge, and if necessary, executioner. He is Frankenstein's Master and currently attends Ye Ran High School in order to learn more about the modern human world.
Frankenstein
Voiced by: Kim SeungJun (2015 animation) (Korean); Daisuke Hirakawa (ONA & anime) (Japanese); Sean Chiplock (English)
Raizel's devoted servant and has loyally served him for over 820 years. He is a scientist, whose abandoned research notes helped to bring the Union's scientific knowledge and technology to the advanced level it has reached in the series. Frankenstein is also the founder and current principal of Ye Ran High School, where he is known to all as the Principal. He is now the latest addition to the RK-5 bearing the title of "Number 0".
Han Shinwoo (Spelt "Shinwu" in English) / Yusuke Tashiro (anime)
Voiced by: Tasuku Hatanaka (ONA), Ryota Iwasaki (anime); John Omohundro (English)
A student of Ye Ran High School and the first person to befriend Raizel after he wakes up from his 820-year slumber. He is also an incredibly skilled martial artist and Ikhan's best friend.
Woo Ikhan / Manabu Kase (anime)
Voiced by: Takuma Nagatsuka (ONA), Yohei Hamada (anime) (Japanese); Landon McDonald (English)
A student at Ye Ran High School and Shinwoo's best friend. He is also a close friend of Frankenstein's household, where he usually hangs out with the rest of his friends. He is very knowledgeable when it comes to technology and hacking.
Seo Yuna / Suh Yuna (ONA) / Emi Iwata (anime)
Voiced by: Madoka Yonezawa (ONA) (Japanese)
A student of Ye Ran High School and a close friend of the Frankenstein household, where she regularly hangs out with the rest of the gang.
Lim Sui
Sui is a popular pop idol who is studying at Ye Ran High School. She first appeared in chapter 94 of the series, in which she is returning to school after doing her concert. Sui is friends with Ikhan, Shinwoo and Yuna; she is always shown hanging out with the group. She later joined Shinwoo and the others in visiting Frankenstein's house regularly.
Muzaka
Voiced by: Choi Han (2015 animation) (Korean)
The Previous Lord
Voiced by: Um SangHyun (2015 animation) (Korean); Junji Majima (anime)
Ashleen
Voiced by: Kim HyunJi (2015 animation) (Korean)
Maduke
Voiced by: Oh InSeong (2015 animation) (Korean)
Gejutel K. Landegre
Voiced by: Jang Kwang (2015 animation) (Korean); Itaru Yamamoto (anime)
Lagus Tradio
Voiced by: Kang GuHan (2015 animation) (Korean)
Roctis Kravei
Voiced by: Jung HoonSuk (2015 animation) (Korean)
Urokai Agvain
Voiced by: Kim DongHa (2015 animation) (Korean)
Zarga Siriana
Voiced by: Choi JunYeong (2015 animation) (Korean)
M-21
Voiced by: Hisafumi Oda (ONA), Kosuke Onishi (anime) (Japanese); Chris Hackney (English)
M-24
Voiced by: Teruyuki Tanzawa (ONA) (Japanese)
Jake
Voiced by: Tōru Ōkawa (ONA) (Japanese)
Marie
Voiced by: Hitomi Nabatame (ONA) (Japanese)
Regis K. Landegre
Voiced by: Akihisa Wakayama (anime)
Seira J. Loyard
Voiced by: Ai Kayano (anime) (Japanese); Brianna Knickerbocker (English)
Tao
Voiced by: Masatomo Nakazawa (anime); Lucien Dodge (English)
Takeo
Voiced by: Takeo Ōtsuka (anime)
Kranz
Voiced by: Jun Kasama (anime)
Shark
Voiced by: Katsumi Fukuhara (anime)
Hammer
Voiced by: Hiroki Yamada (anime)
Erga Kenesis Di Raskreia
Voiced by: Ayana Taketatsu (anime)
Ludis Mergas
Voiced by: Mutsumi Tamura (anime)
Karias Blerster
Voiced by: Oki Sugiyama (anime)
Rajak Kertia
Voiced by: Kentarō Kumagai (anime); Chris Hackney (English)
Rael Kertia
Voiced by: Daishi Kajita (anime)

=== Nobles/Noblesse ===
An ancient and powerful race that possess great strength, speed and telepathy as well as various blood related abilities, such as the talent to grant similar powers to others via contracts "of blood and soul." They reside on an island nation, known as Lukedonia, that cannot be detected by human senses. They have guarded humans against predators and the forces of nature as long as they have existed, due to a genetic inability to ignore the slaughter of the weak, helpless humans. Thousands of years ago, they were worshipped as gods by various cultures around the world.

== Manhwa ==
=== Volume list ===
No.	Korean release date	Korean ISBN
1	September 28, 2011	978-8-90-113012-5
2	October 7, 2011	978-8-90-113013-2
3	October 7, 2011	978-8-90-113014-9
4	January 12, 2012	978-8-90-113918-0
5	January 12, 2012	978-8-90-113919-7
6	January 12, 2012	978-8-90-113920-3
7	July 27, 2012	978-8-90-114853-3
8	July 16, 2012	978-8-90-114854-0
9	July 27, 2012	978-8-90-114855-7
10	December 19, 2012	978-8-90-115262-2
11	December 19, 2012	978-8-90-115263-9
12	December 19, 2012	978-8-90-115264-6
13	October 29, 2013	978-8-90-116099-3
14	October 29, 2013	978-8-90-116100-6
15	October 29, 2013	978-8-90-116101-3
16	October 29, 2013	978-8-90-116102-0
17	April 25, 2016	979-1-19-571965-5
18	April 25, 2016	979-1-19-571966-2
19	April 25, 2016	979-1-19-571967-9
20	February 10, 2017	979-1-18-733316-6
21	February 10, 2017	979-1-18-733317-3
22	February 10, 2017	979-1-18-733318-0
23	February 10, 2017	979-1-18-733319-7
24	February 10, 2017	979-1-18-733320-3
25	February 10, 2017	979-1-18-733321-0

== Animation ==
=== 2015 animation ===
The first animated version of Noblesse was revealed at the 17th Bucheon International Animation Festival. Its screening time was 37 minutes. It was produced by Studio Animal, a South Korean animation studio, and the animation was first released as a DVD by Woongjin Thinkbig Funnism on December 4, 2015, while its VOD service started later on February 4, 2016.

On December 4, 2015, Noblesse: Beginning of Destruction (Kor. 노블레스: 파멸의 시작: Pamyeol-ui Sijak) was created by Studio Animal as the first full-length animated version of Noblesse. It was an original video animation (OVA) revealed at the 17th Bucheon International Animation Festival in DVD form, from Woongjin Thinkbig Funnism.

Tooniverse released the English subtitled version of the animation on YouTube on January 1, 2017, divided into two parts.

=== Anime ===
On February 4, 2016, a 31-minute original net animation (ONA), titled Noblesse: Awakening, was released on Crunchyroll and YouTube. Animated by Production I.G, the anime covers the first volume of the manhwa in a heavily abridged format with several minor changes to the story.

On August 2, 2019, at Comic Con Seoul, it was announced that an anime television series adaptation was currently in production. Production I.G animated the series, and Crunchyroll streamed it internationally outside Asian regions as a co-production. The series is licensed by Muse Communication in Southeast Asia. The series was directed by Yasutaka Yamamoto, with Sayaka Harada handling series composition, and Akiharu Ishii handling character designs. Yoshihiro Ike and Shun Narita composed the series' music.

It aired from October 7 to December 30, 2020, on Crunchyroll. In Japan, the series was televised an hour after its Crunchyroll launch, on Tokyo MX and two hours and thirty minutes after, on BS11. Kim Jae-joong performed the series' opening theme song "BREAKING DAWN", while Oh My Girl performed the series' ending theme song "Etoile." On November 11, 2020, Crunchyroll announced dubs for the series in English, Spanish, Portuguese, French and German, which premiered on November 18, 2020.

On May 18, 2021, it was announced Sentai Filmworks picked up the home video rights.

The Noblesse anime series takes place directly after the events of the Noblesse: Awakening ONA, and begins from the second volume of the manhwa.

No.	Title (Note: All English episode titles taken from Crunchyroll.)	Directed by	Written by	Original release date (Note: Crunchyroll releases the episodes every Wednesday at 11:00 PM JST while Tokyo MX airs the episodes an hour later at 12:00 AM JST, which is effectively Thursday. For simplicity purposes, the air date will reflect the promotional date.)
0	"Noblesse: Awakening"	Shunsuke Tada (chief); Ken'ichi Matsuzawa	Shun Fukudome	February 4, 2016 (ONA)
In this prologue to the Noblesse anime series, Raizel awakens from his 820 year long slumber inside a coffin and restarts his life in modern day Japan. (Note: In the original manhwa, the story takes place in South Korea.) He discovers his loyal servant Frankenstein has become the principal to a high school and is informed of the changes that have occurred since he was asleep. Raizel decides to enroll in his servant's school as a student and soon befriends three other students: Yusuke Tashiro, Manabu Kase and Emi Iwata. These students are soon attacked and kidnapped by Union members Mari and Jake in an attempt to draw out Raizel. The Union members were tipped off by Union experiments M-21 and M-24, who get warned not to interfere any longer. While the four Union associates hide out within an abandoned building, Raizel and Frankenstine arrive to save the students. M-24 decides to protect the students from Jake by blowing himself up after Jake states his intention to kill them. Frankenstine battles Mari on the rooftop and easily takes her out after getting permission to go all out by Raizel. Raizel arrives inside and swiftly destroys Jake using his own blood against him. M-21 is astonished at Raizel's power and recognizes him as a noble.
1	"What Must Be Protected / Ordinary"; Transliteration: "Mamorubekimono / Ordinary" (Japanese: 守るべきもの / Ordinary)	Yasutaka Yamamoto	Sayaka Harada	October 7, 2020
A special forces team known as the DA-5 kill off military combat units in an unknown location and get ready to set out to Japan for their next mission, an investigation into the disappearance of two Union members. Meanwhile, Raizel, the protector of the nobles, along with his loyal servant Frankenstein and former Union experiment M-21, continue to spend their days at Ye Ran High School, all while keeping their true identities a secret. M-21 has been assigned to be a security guard for the school in order to pay off his debts of living in Frankenstine's house. During the morning, Frankenstine affirms to Raizel that he had erased the memories of his friends who were involved in their recent incident against members of the Union. The same day, a violent gang barges onto school grounds looking for Yusuke Tashiro, a person involved in the incident with the Union members, one of which broke his arm. The gang is there for an unrelated incident in which Tashiro saved the gang leader's girlfriend from tripping, which angered him. M-21 decides to let go of his fear of being detected and effortlessly takes down the gang's leader, causing them to leave in panic. Later that night, DA-5 arrives in Japan to begin their investigation. Meanwhile, two other unknown people gaze from a rooftop.
2	"A Reason to Fight / Nobility"; Transliteration: "Tatakau Riyū / Nobility" (Japanese: 戦う理由 / Nobility)	Ryūta Kawahara	Sayaka Harada	October 14, 2020
Regis and Seira arrive to investigate the incident around the events that occurred at the abandoned building and soon find their way to Ye Ran High School to interrogate principal Frankenstine. Regis attempts to control Frankenstein, who recognizes this power to be similar to Raizel's. Regis dictates that they will be transfer students at the school and Frankenstine plays along in an attempt to investigate them for Raizel. Tashiro is assigned with helping them around the school. On their way home, M-21 consults with Frankenstine and concludes that these people must be nobles like Raizel. Frankenstine discovers that Tashiro has brought Regis and Seira to his home because he was informed by them that they have nowhere to live. Raizel gives the ok to Frankenstine to accept them into his house. The next day, Regis confronts M-21 after school regarding the whereabouts of the missing coffin and they soon fight after mistrust ensues. Seira informs Regis of an incident with Tashiro and bullies and they both stop the fight to go and try to help. When they arrive, Tashiro has already taken care of them and everyone walks back home for the night.
3	"Night's Footsteps / Fall Out"; Transliteration: "Yoru no Ashioto / Fall Out" (Japanese: 夜の足音 / Fall Out)	Moe Suzuki	Daishirō Tanimura	October 21, 2020
4	"Spiderweb / Long Fall"; Transliteration: "Kumonosu / Long Fall" (Japanese: 蜘蛛の巣 / Long Fall)	Nana Harada	Daishirō Tanimura	October 28, 2020
5	"A Friend's Hand / Fight for..." Transliteration: "Tomo no Te / Fight for..." (Japanese: 友の手 / Fight for...)	Kazuma Ogasawara	Daisuke Ōhigashi	November 4, 2020
6	"Great Power / Raizel"; Transliteration: "Ōinaru Chikara / Raizel" (Japanese: 大いなる力 / Raizel)	Yasutaka Yamamoto; Shigeru Ueda	Daisuke Ōhigashi	November 11, 2020
7	"The Girl I'm Into Is a Noble / Unforgettable"; Transliteration: "Ki ni Naru Ano Ko wa Kizoku-sama / Unforgettable" (Japanese: 気になるあの娘は貴族様 / Unforgettable)	Shunsuke Tada	Daishirō Tanimura	November 18, 2020
8	"Frankenstein / First Contact"; Transliteration: "Furankenshutain / First Contact" (Japanese: フランケンシュタイン / First Contact)	Nana Harada	Sayaka Harada	November 25, 2020
9	"Blood Pact / Devote"; Transliteration: "Chi no Keiyaku / Devote" (Japanese: 血の契約 / Devote)	Nobuaki Nakanishi	Sayaka Harada	December 2, 2020
10	"Dangerous Man / LOVEPARADE"; Transliteration: "Kiken na Otoko / LOVEPARADE" (Japanese: 危険な男 / LOVEPARADE)	Kazuki Yokoyama	Muri Sasaki	December 9, 2020
11	"Lord / Lost Child"; Transliteration: "Rōdo / Lost Child" (Japanese: ロード / Lost Child)	Yūshi Ibe	Muri Sasaki	December 16, 2020
12	"That All May Be as It Should Be / Execution"; Transliteration: "Subete wa, Tadashiku aru Tame ni / Execution" (Japanese: 全ては、正しくあるために / Execution)	Kazuma Ogasawara; Ken'ichi Matsuzawa	Daishirō Tanimura	December 23, 2020
13	"Noblesse / Take Her Hand"; Transliteration: "Noburesu / Take Her Hand" (Japanese: ノブレス / Take Her Hand)	Yasutaka Yamamoto	Sayaka Harada	December 30, 2020

== Other media ==
On November 7, 2016, Air Seoul announced that it had collaborated with Naver Webtoon to produce a safety video. Some of the works shown here include Denma, The Sound of Heart, and Noblesse.

In March 2016, four characters from Noblesse were added as player characters in Nexon's 2015 mobile game Fantasy War Tactics. For the duration of the month, various special Noblesse-related items were added, such as a "Noblesse Coin" and "Noblesse Black Coocoo" equipment.

In June 2016, the Noblesse event returned, adding Raizel as a fifth hero.

The first episode of Alpha is about the Union, the modified human, and the experimenter. At the end, there is a logo called JHS studio, which reveals that Alpha, and this work are in the same world. Because the representative of JHS studio is Son Je-ho, who was the author of this work.
