= Falling Up (Stray Kids song) =

Single by Stray Kids

from the album Giant
- Language: Japanese; English; Korean
- A-side: "Night"
- Released: October 7, 2024
- Studio: JYPE (Seoul)
- Genre: Trap-pop; arena rock
- Length: 3:10
- Label: Epic Japan; JYP
- Composers: Bang Chan; Changbin; Restart; Chae Gang-hae
- Lyricists: Bang Chan; Changbin; KM-Markit (Note: Japanese version only); Sophia Pae (Note: English version only)

Stray Kids singles chronology
"Chk Chk Boom" (2024)	"Falling Up" / "Night" (2024)	"Come Play" (2024)

"Falling Up" is a song by South Korean boy band Stray Kids, taken from their second Japanese-language studio album Giant (2024). It was released as a single in three versions—Japanese, English, and Korean—along with "Night" by Epic Records Japan and JYP Entertainment on October 7, 2024. The song serves as an ending theme for the "Workshop Battle" arc of the second season of Kami no Tō: Tower of God.

== Background and release ==
In 2020, Stray Kids previously performed the ending theme "Slump" for the Japanese anime adaption of South Korean webtoon series Tower of God, titled Kami no Tō: Tower of God. "Slump" was later released as a B-side for the Japanese debut single "Top", which debuted atop the Oricon Singles Chart, making the group the fourth foreign artist to do so in history after Jang Keun-suk, Exo, and iKon.

The second season of Kami no Tō: Tower of God was announced in November 2023, and premiered in July next year, which the first arc "Return of the Prince" was accompanied by opening theme "Rise Up" and ending theme "Believe" by labelmate NiziU. On September 8, 2024, it was announced that Stray Kids would be in charge of the opening and ending themes for the second arc of the second season of Kami no Tō: Tower of God, subtitled "Workshop Battle". The ending theme, titled "Falling Up", first appeared on the non-credit end titles for the anime, uploaded on October 2. The song was released in three versions—Japanese, English, and Korean—on October 7.

== Composition ==
Stray Kids' members Bang Chan and Changbin wrote and co-composed "Falling Up" with Restart and Chae Gang-hae. KM-Markit and Sophia Pae co-wrote the Japanese and English versions, respectively. It is described as a combination of trap-pop and arena rock about overcoming adversity.

== Track listing ==
- Digital download and streaming – Japanese version
1. "Falling Up" – 2:54
- Digital download and streaming – English version
1. "Falling Up" (English version) – 2:54
- Digital download and streaming – Korean version
1. "Night" (from Tower of God: Workshop Battle; Korean version) – 2:54
2. "Falling Up" (from Tower of God: Workshop Battle; Korean version) – 3:10

== Credits and personnel ==
Personnel

- Stray Kids – vocals
  - Bang Chan (3Racha) – background vocals, lyrics, composition, arrangement, vocal direction, vocal editing
  - Changbin (3Racha) – lyrics, composition, vocal direction
  - Han (3Racha) – vocal direction
- KM-Markit – lyrics (Japanese version)
- Sophia Pae – lyrics (English version)
- Restart – composition, arrangement, instruments, computer programming, vocal direction
- Chae Gang-hae – composition, arrangement, instruments, computer programming
- Lee Kyeong-won – vocal editing
- Lim Chan-mi – recording
- Yoon Won-kwon – mixing
- Kwon Nam-woo – mastering

Locations

- JYPE Studios – recording
- MadMiix – mixing
- 821 Sound Mastering – mastering

== Charts ==
Chart performance for "Falling Up"
Chart (2024)	Peak position
Japan Download Songs (Billboard Japan)	9
Japan Streaming Songs (Billboard Japan)	69
Japan Digital Singles (Oricon)	13
South Korea Download (Circle)	154
UK Singles Downloads (Official Charts)	96
US World Digital Song Sales (Billboard)	2

== Release history ==
Release dates and formats for "Falling Up"
Region	Date	Format	Version	Label	Ref.
Various	October 7, 2024	Digital download; streaming	Japanese; English	Epic Japan	
Various	October 7, 2024	Digital download; streaming	Korean	JYP	
South Korea	October 7, 2024	Digital download; streaming	Japanese; English	JYP	
