= Night (Stray Kids song) =

- Korean version cover

Single by Stray Kids

from the album Giant
- Language: Japanese; English; Korean
- B-side: "Falling Up"
- Released: October 7, 2024
- Studio: JYPE (Seoul)
- Genre: Pop
- Length: 2:54
- Label: Epic Japan; JYP
- Composers: Bang Chan; Changbin; Han; Versachoi
- Lyricists: Bang Chan; Changbin; Han; D&H (Note: Japanese version only); Sophia Pae (Note: English version only)

Stray Kids singles chronology
"Chk Chk Boom" (2024)	"Night" / "Falling Up" (2024)	"Come Play" (2024)

"Night" is a song by South Korean boy band Stray Kids, taken from their second Japanese-language studio album Giant (2024). It was released as a single in three versions—Japanese, English, and Korean—along with "Falling Up" by Epic Records Japan and JYP Entertainment on October 7, 2024. The song serves as an opening theme for the "Workshop Battle" arc of the second season of Kami no Tō: Tower of God.

== Background and release ==
In 2020, Stray Kids previously performed the opening theme "Top" for the Japanese anime adaption of South Korean webtoon series Tower of God, titled Kami no Tō: Tower of God. "Top" was released as the group's debut single in Japan, along with the B-side "Slump", and debuted atop the Oricon Singles Chart, making the group the fourth foreign artist to do so in history after Jang Keun-suk, Exo, and iKon.

The second season of Kami no Tō: Tower of God was announced in November 2023, and premiered in July next year, which the first arc "Return of the Prince" was accompanied by opening theme "Rise Up" and ending theme "Believe" by labelmate NiziU. On September 8, 2024, it was announced that Stray Kids would be in charge of the opening and ending themes for the second arc of the second season of Kami no Tō: Tower of God, subtitled "Workshop Battle". The opening theme, titled "Night", first appeared on the non-credit opening sequence for the anime, uploaded on September 29. and was later released in three versions—Japanese, English, and Korean—on October 7.

== Composition ==
"Night" was written by the group's in-house production team 3Racha Bang Chan, Changbin, and Han) and Versachoi. D&H (Purple Night) handles the Japanese lyrics, while Sophia Pae co-wrote the English lyrics. Real Sound's Tomoyuki Mori described that the song is a pop track, featuring "sad melody and aggressive rap amidst a heavy rock sound" with starting of "guitar pick scratches" and "1990s mix technique".

== Track listing ==
- Digital download and streaming – Japanese version
1. "Night" – 2:54
- Digital download and streaming – English version
1. "Night" (English version) – 2:54
- Digital download and streaming – Korean version
1. "Night" (from Tower of God: Workshop Battle; Korean version) – 2:54
2. "Falling Up" (from Tower of God: Workshop Battle; Korean version) – 3:10

== Credits and personnel ==
Personnel

- Stray Kids – vocals
  - Bang Chan (3Racha) – lyrics, composition, vocal direction, vocal editing
  - Changbin (3Racha) – lyrics, composition, vocal direction
  - Han (3Racha) – lyrics, composition, vocal direction
- D&H (Purple Night) – lyrics (Japanese version)
- Sophia Pae – lyrics (English version)
- Versachoi – composition, arrangement, computer programming, piano, synthesizer, vocal direction
- Rha Kyung-weoi – guitar, bass
- Lee Kyeong-won – vocal editing
- Goo Hye-jin – recording
- Lim Chan-mi – recording (Japanese and Korean version)
- Yoon Won-kwon – mixing
- Kwon Nam-woo – mastering

Locations

- JYPE Studios – recording
- MadMiix – mixing
- 821 Sound Mastering – mastering

== Charts ==
Chart performance for "Night"
Chart (2024)	Peak position
Japan Hot 100 (Billboard)	93
Japan Combined Singles (Oricon)	48
South Korea BGM (Circle)	179
South Korea Download (Circle)	69
UK Singles Sales (OCC)	52

== Release history ==
Release dates and formats for "Night"
Region	Date	Format	Version	Label	Ref.
Various	October 7, 2024	Digital download; streaming	Japanese; English	Epic Japan	
Various	October 7, 2024	Digital download; streaming	Korean	JYP	
South Korea	October 7, 2024	Digital download; streaming	Japanese; English	JYP	
