= Tower of God season 2 =

Second season of the anime TV series

Tower of God
- Season 2
- Key visual for Return of the Prince
- No. of episodes: 26

Release
- Original network: Tokyo MX
- Original release: July 7 – December 29, 2024

Season chronology
- ← Previous; Season 1

Tower of God is an anime television series based on S.I.U.'s manhwa of the same name. The second season of the anime adapts up to chapter 110 of the second volume of the manhwa. It premiered on July 7, 2024, and aired in two consecutive story arc cours on Tokyo MX and other networks. The first part, titled Tower of God: Return of the Prince aired from July 7, 2024 to September 29, 2024. The second part, titled Tower of God: Workshop Battle aired from October 6, 2024 to December 29, 2024. It is produced by The Answer Studio and directed by Akira Suzuki, with Kazuyoshi Takeuchi serving as chief director. Erika Yoshida worked on the series composition, with character designs by Miho Tanino, Seigo Kitazawa and Yoshimitsu Kashima, and music by Kevin Penkin.

The second season is set six years after the events of the first, on the 20th floor, where the Regulars are screened once again. Despite struggling to advance, Ja Wangnan remains determined to climb the tower and become the "King of the Tower." Wangnan meets Viole, a mysterious, long-haired individual with overwhelming strength. Viole is a Slayer Candidate for FUG, a criminal syndicate that opposes Jahad (or 'Zahard'), the king of the tower.

In August 2022, during their industry panel at Crunchyroll Expo, Crunchyroll announced that a second season was in production. For the first cours covering the "Return of the Prince" story arc, the opening theme song is "Rise Up", while the ending theme song is "Believe"; both are performed by NiziU. For the second cours covering the "Workshop Battle" story arc, the opening theme song is "Night", while the ending theme song is "Falling Up"; both are performed by Stray Kids.

== Episodes ==
No. overall	No. in season	Title	Directed by	Written by	Storyboarded by (Note: Production staff information is taken from the ending credits of each episode.)	Original release date
Return of the Prince
14	1	"Last Chance" (Note: Stylized in all caps)	Yoshitsugu Kimura	Erika Yoshida	Toshihiko Masuda	July 7, 2024
The 20th floor of the Tower is a special place where Regulars who have received permission to enter the Tower once undergo screening again. To become an E-rank Regular and earn the right to climb even higher, Ja Wangnan takes on tests that challenge him more than anything he has faced so far. He is determined to become the "King of the Tower". However, a flame-throwing girl defeats him again, and Kim Lurker puts him in debt. He asks Kim for a "Last Chance" and takes the test once more to escape from him. Nia, a friendly boy who works at a local restaurant on the 20th floor, meets Wangnan. He also participates in the tower climbing exam, and as a favor, he delivers food to Wangnan's room. Wangnan also feels a friendship for him and trusts him. On the testing floor, he meets a strong, mysterious person who defeats everyone before his arrival. The person remembers about his old companions, including Khun and Rachel, during the fight and is unable to defeat Wangnan and others.
15	2	"The Strongest Regular"; Transliteration: "Saikyō no Senbetsu-sha" (Japanese: 最強の選別者)	Taiki Nishimura	Erika Yoshida	Namako Umino	July 14, 2024
Bam (Viole) remembers about Rachel telling him a story. After passing the first test, Wangnan, Viole, Kang Horyang, Miseng, Goseng, and Hon Akraptor wait for the other test takers in a waiting room. They feel concerned about the presence of the overwhelmingly powerful Viole, a member of FUG, a massive criminal organization. Wangnan recognizes other familiar faces like Nia, Yeon Yihwa, and Kim Lurker. Yeon Yihwa, recognizable due to her hairband, is a daughter of one of the ten great families. Lurker introduces Prince as the son of his company's president. The president bribes the exam proctor to fix Prince's fellow test takers to get him to the 20th floor. The president also hires mercenaries to help Prince. The test proctor, Mule Love, explains the second test: a physical strengthening test using a Shinsu measuring instrument. When the Regulars strengthen their bodies using Shinsu and touch the device, the screen displays the score and rank. Love explains that only eight test takers will be selected. The test administrator proposes a deal to Viole, who scores the highest on the test, and refuses to take anyone with him. Jue Viole Grace reveals that he is a FUG Slayer candidate and that his mission is to slay the Jahad family that rules the Tower. He tells test administrator Love to fail all the other test takers. Love proposes that he will do as Viole says if he beats him in a one-on-one game, and Viole accepts his offer.Wangnan cannot find his ring in his locker. Viole finds the ring, which has the crest of Jahad, on the floor and gives it to him. Wangnan dismisses it as being unimportant and calls it Jahad fashion.
16	3	"The Trustworthy Room"; Transliteration: "Shinji Rareru Heya" (Japanese: 信じられる部屋)	Tsutomu Murakami	Erika Yoshida	Tsutomu Murakami	July 21, 2024
Wangnan and the others engage in the battle of the "Trustworthy Room" test. A team of at least seven players must secure six rooms. Regulars will use a remote to select a "Leader" and a "Gatekeeper" for each room. Leaders can recruit "Fellows" or steal rooms, transferring captured rooms to themselves. Gatekeepers can only own rooms, which can be taken from them. Leaders can transfer room ownership to their Fellows and appoint new Gatekeepers, but they cannot be Gatekeepers themselves. To recruit Fellows, they have to insert the Leader's connector into slot 1 and the Fellow's connector into slot 2, then press the blue button. To transfer ownership, they have to insert the receiver's connector into slot 1 and the Gatekeeper's connector into slot 2, then press the red button. One team member must remain in a room at all times, and the sixth room acquired must be room 608, belonging to Viole and Yihwa. The team that acquires at least seven members and six rooms wins. Viole has different rules. Love has Viole's connector. Yihwa's and Viole's connectors have both Leader and Gatekeeper roles. Viole can win by taking Love's connector and Yihwa's room or if fewer than seven test takers remain due to conflict.
17	4	"Ramen and the Great Big Sky"; Transliteration: "Rāmen to Hiroi Sora" (Japanese: ラーメンと広い空)	Michita Shiraishi	Takeshi Miyamoto	Kei Suzuki	July 28, 2024
Love tells Viole that FUG killed his parents, and he seeks revenge. When Love asks why Viole joined FUG, Viole replies that he needs to meet someone above. Yihwa begins to think Viole may not be bad after he spares her life, but Tin, claiming to represent Prince, kidnaps her. Meanwhile, Wangnan captures five rooms, leaving only Yihwa's to win. He asks Nia if his room is safe, but Lurker captures Nia and reveals his betrayal. Nia shares how his companions betrayed him, and an old woman helped him run a restaurant. When Lurker threatened them, Nia agreed to make other Regulars fail to forgive her debt. Wangnan says he holds no grudge against Nia, but Lurker punches Nia to death as Wangnan pleads for him to stop. Lurker reveals he controls seven rooms, including Prince's and Yihwa's. Wangnan interrupts Viole and Love's fight by taking Viole's connector from Love and asking for his help. When Lurker orders Robdevil to kill Prince, Horyang rescues him, and Viole helps Yihwa regain consciousness. Wangnan and Viole follow Lurker to his room, where Wangnan notices Lurker using a water bottle to control Shinsu and takes it. Wangnan confronts Lurker, declaring that he is receiving divine punishment for everyone who suffered because of him, especially Nia. Lurker dismisses Wangnan's reasoning and mocks him for justifying his actions. Wangnan, enraged, demands to know how Lurker justifies killing Nia. Though he vows never to forgive Lurker, Wangnan ultimately chooses forgiveness, realizing that continuing the cycle of injustice solves nothing. Lurker scoffs at this but Wangnan vows to change the Tower's injustices, promising to become its King and urging Lurker to live decently in honor of Nia's memory. Wangnan then swaps connectors with Viole, allowing Viole to steal the final room. This forms a new team led by Jue Viole Grace, with Hon Akraptor, Ja Wangnan, Kang Horyang, Prince, Yeo Goseng, Yeo Miseng, and Yeon Yihwa. Love apologizes to the Test Director and offers his resignation, but the Director instructs him to send the team upstairs and forget his grudge against FUG. After Love leaves, the Director tells Submerged Fish that the mission is complete, as Wangnan passed the test as FUG desired. Viole later asks Wangnan why he forgave Lurker. Wangnan explains that he seeks forgiveness too and is no different from Lurker, as he might lie or kill to climb the Tower. Viole questions his desperation to climb, and Wangnan replies that he dislikes the Tower's divisive nature and wants to make it a place where everyone can laugh and see a bigger sky.
18	5	"The Other Team"; Transliteration: "Mō Hitotsu no Chīmu" (Japanese: もうひとつのチーム)	Makoto Ōga	Erika Yoshida	Masayoshi Nishida	August 4, 2024
Khun Aguero Agnes recalls Bam, who thanked him for his support. On the 25th floor, Khun seeks new members and bets speedy Edin Dan that if he wins, Dan will join his team; if Dan wins, he gets Suspendium. Khun wins and recruits Edin, forming a new team after parting with his original one. He suspects Rachel may have killed Bam, knowing she can walk and is deceiving others. His new team includes Edin, Novik, Apple, Michael, Gyetang, and Ran. He warns Shibisu about Rachel before splitting, advising him to continue climbing with the original team. Khun tells his new team to become friends with Rachel but remain cautious, promising to fulfill their wishes once he becomes head of the Khun family. Meanwhile, Yihwa investigates rumors of Viole causing chaos in a shopping center, only to find a delinquent impersonating him and trying to extort Hwaryun. Viole arrives and defeats the impostor.
19	6	"Zygaena's Flower"; Transliteration: "Chigena no Hana" (Japanese: チゲナの花)	Shintaro Noro	Takeshi Miyamoto	Masayoshi Nishida	August 11, 2024
Wangnan and the others arrive on the 21st floor. Yeon Yihwa happens to see Viole meeting with fellow FUG members Hwaryun and Ha Jinsung, a high ranker. Hwaryun reveals about Viole's past to Wangnan, that Viole was forced to join FUG in exchange for FUG not killing Viole's friends. Wangnan tells Hwyaryn that FUG is inhuman. Later that night, Wangnan apologises to Viole for calling him a bad guy. Yihwa comes to talk something to Viole, but Wangnan teases her. Jinsung watches them from a distance while Karaka, a mysterious figure, appears from the dark. Later, Wangnan's team heads to the testing area, but their opponents flee due to Viole's presence, resulting in them taking a test named Zygaena's flower test. Zygaena, a deep-sea fish worshipped as a god on the 21st floor, has a highly valued flower. The test's goal is to enter Zygaena's body and retrieve the flower. When Wangnan's team finally finds the flower inside the creature's massive body, a mysterious man appears before them.
20	7	"Mazino Magic"; Transliteration: "Maji no Majikku" (Japanese: マジノマジック)	Shige Fukase	Takeshi Miyamoto	Toshihiko Masuda	August 18, 2024
The mysterious man is seeking the flower for an entirely different reason. Viole encounters him and orders Prince and Horyang to go away. The mysterious man tells him to play a game to defeat each other. He tells Viole about his goal to go out of the tower and become truly free and see the endless sky. Meanwhile, Prince and Horyang inform everyone to attack the man all at once. The man defeats Prince and Horyang and tells them that they need at least an "Opera" to stop him for a tenth of a second. While engaging in a fierce battle, he and Viole were about to punch each other, but Miseng appeared between them. Viole protects her but gets heavily injured. The man says he has no intention of continuing to fight as he got Zygaena's baby. His tattoo on his back reveals his identity as Urek Mazino. As he went out of Zygaena's body, he defeated Noma and got to know how powerful people from the 21st floor of the tower have been hiding about Zygaena's kid, who gets its nutrients from the flower. They used to steal the flower to maintain the flower's value. Mazino takes the kid and says that a few years from now, thousands of Zygaena's kid will be born and the flower's value will decrease. Later, Mazino tells his assistant to keep an eye on Viole. Two days later, Viole remains unconscious, and news breaks that the Yeon family is involved in covering up Zygaena's children, devastating Yihwa, who isolates herself. Hwaryun encourages her to keep climbing to change public perception. Jinsung offers Wangnan the option to separate from Viole for safety, but Wangnan declines and chooses to continue climbing with Viole. Karaka meets Hinsung, warning him that rumors are spreading in FUG about his leniency towards Viole. Hinsung insists he is loyal to FUG. Later, Hwaryun informs Wangnan about the "Workshop Battle" on the 30th floor, as he seeks to find Viole's old friends.
21	8	"Her Name Is Emily"; Transliteration: "Kanojo no Nawa Emirī" (Japanese: 彼女の名はエミリー)	Taiki Nishimura	Riuji Yoshizaki	Daisuke Kurose	August 25, 2024
Two years have passed since the Zygaena test. Emily, a chat robot that Acorn Workshop developed, is gaining popularity among regulars in "BOX", where Lighthouse Bearers share information, for her ability to answer every question by taking data from others. On the 29th floor, Khun feels disappointed in Dan because he used Emily to take suggestions during a test and told him not to depend on Emily. Dan gave his phone to Khun to keep Emily away. Rachel appreciates Dan for being the fastest person in the team and says that she is jealous of his ability and wishes he could "become her legs". Meanwhile, on the 28th floor, Wangnan's team is taking a test. Quaetro and Chang took the key from Wangnan that they needed to win the test. Quaetro, who is a fire user, says that he followed Wangnan because he reminded him of Chirpy, a pet chicken, who died when Quaetro was a kid. Wangnan tries to calm him, but Quaetro suddenly remembers that he roasted Chirpy to death. When Quaetro is about to attack Wangnan, Viole saves him. Quaetro has three baangs, but when he and Chang see that Viole has five baangs, they concede defeat, and Wangnan's team wins the test. Wangnan tells his team about participating in the Workshop Battle, which is two months away, to get good items. Meanwhile, Khun uses Edin's phone to ask Emily if 25th Bam is alive, and Emily replies that he is alive. Meanwhile, a "Traveller" chats with Emily and tells her that he believes she is human. The Traveller thanks Emily for helping him get this far and says that he will meet Emily no matter how much distance separates them and confesses his love to her. A facility shows a human kept in a pod named Emily.
22	9	"One-Winged Devil"; Transliteration: "Hen'yoku no Akuma" (Japanese: 片翼の悪魔)	Tsutomu Murakami	Takeshi Miyamoto	Toshikatsu Tokoro	September 1, 2024
Khun inquires about Bam's location, and Emily admits she doesn't know. Apple informs Khun about the "Devil of the Right Arm", explaining that Hatz lost to him and that she found him on the 28th floor after someone uploaded his photo to BOX. This prompts Khun to decide to capture him. Meanwhile, Wangnan's team learns about the "Devil of the Right Arm" and is intrigued by his resemblance to Horyang. Horyang identifies the person in BOX as Beniamino Cassano and shares their past, revealing that both were abandoned as children in the Middle Area and raised in the same facility due to restrictions on childbirth for certain families. Most children in the area either die or get sold off, and both end up as workshop test subjects. The workshops will do anything to create weapons, even using humans. Horyang meets Cassano, who becomes his friend, and they bond like brothers. They encounter Sophia, a research assistant who treats them as humans and names them Beniamino Ilmar and Beniamino Cassano. Later, they learn the truth about the experiments conducted by Maddox, who reveals that only two out of 99,999 people can become "Living Ignition Weapons". He plans to assimilate weapons with living humans, intending for Cassano and Horyang to receive half of the devil. After the experiment, Horyang wakes up in the Tower, becomes a Regular, and climbs with little difficulty, eventually earning the title "Devil of the Right Arm". He feels guilty about his power's origins and stops climbing after reaching the 20th floor. He hears rumors of someone resembling him and believes Cassano has come to the Tower looking for him. On the 28th floor, Horyang expresses his intent to meet Cassano, and Wangnan's team plans to join him. Viole recalls his past and later meets Horyang, discussing their powers and FUG's involvement in experiments. Viole reveals that seven years ago, he learned "how to become god" from Jinsung and experienced a red light within him. Horyang believes him and leaves to find Cassano, stating that Wangnan's team is the only one that treats him like family. Meanwhile, Gyetang suspects he has bird flu and cannot accompany Khun to find Cassano, so he stays with Apple, Michael, and Dan.
23	10	"The Hand of Arlen"; Transliteration: "Aruren no Te" (Japanese: アルレンの手)	Taro Yamada	Riuji Yoshizaki	Masayoshi Nishida	September 8, 2024
Wangnan's team discussed meeting Cassano with Horyang, who left to find him at the tent village on the 28th floor. He asked information seller Xia Xia about Cassano's whereabouts, and she informed him that Cassano was at the Hand of Arlen, warning him of traps in the area. Meanwhile, Khun's team arrived near the Hand of Arlen, suspecting that their knowledge of Cassano was too convenient and that the photo in BOX served as an invitation. Novik and Ran, who had separated from Khun, mistakenly attacked Horyang thinking he was Cassano. Viole informed Wangnan and Arkraptor that Horyang had gone alone, fearing he might feel isolated, which reminded Viole of his past and prompted him to search for Horyang. Prince and Yihwa overheard and decided to borrow a ship from Yihwa's family to help bring Horyang back. As Horyang approached the Hand of Arlen, he heard Cassano calling him and finally met him. Cassano confirmed to Novik and Ran that he was the person they were looking for. Meanwhile, Khun's lighthouse alerted him that he had triggered a trap, causing him to lose consciousness. Later, Viole arrived at Xia Xia's location, asking about Horyang. Xia Xia offered to guide him through the traps to Horyang for a fee. At that moment, a snake-like individual attempted to steal Khun's earrings while he was unconscious, but Khun's Armor Inventory protected him. He woke up, stabbed the thief, and asked him who hired him. The thief revealed that someone with rabbit ears had sent him to kill anyone entering the ruins. Khun then knocked him out. Khun wondered who would send an assassin after him and what their intentions were with the Devil of the Right Arm as bait. Meanwhile, Novik and Ran seemingly killed Cassano at the Hand of Arlen. Viole heard the noise and rushed toward the scene, after saving Xia Xia from a trap she had stepped into intentionally. She asked about Viole's relationship with Horyang, assuming they were good friends, but Viole replied that they were just acquaintances.
24	11	"A Thick and Distant Wall"; Transliteration: "Atsukute Tōi Kabe" (Japanese: 厚くて遠い壁)	Yoshitsugu Kimura	Riuji Yoshizaki	Toshihiko Masuda	September 15, 2024
Agitated by Cassano getting injured, Horyang starts fighting with Novik and Ran, but Cassano stabs Horyang and seemingly kills him. Viole arrives and misunderstands Novik and Ran for killing Horyang as Xia Xia confirms to Viole that they killed Horyang by looking through her lighthouse. While Viole overpowers them during the fight, Khun rushes to the scene. Xia Xia reveals that she has put explosives inside the Hand of Arlen and works for FUG. FUG blackmails Viole through his pocket to obey their orders. Cassano wakes up from the rubble and takes Horyang. FUG promises Viole to save Horyang and spare Khun and Horyang if he goes with them. Xia Xia reveals FUG's plans to lure Khun to kill him, and she exposes Apple and Michael as spies in Khun's team. Viole, not revealing his identity, tells Khun to leave, but Khun understands that he is trying to help him. Xia Xia activates the explosives and escapes along with Viole. Meanwhile, Apple and Michael capture Dan while they poison Gyetang to death. Apple reveals that FUG hired them to infiltrate Khun's team. Rachel stabs Dan after he learns that she hired FUG to kill Khun.
25	12	"A New Trial"; Transliteration: "Aratana Shiren" (Japanese: 新たな試練)	Shige Fukase	Takeshi Miyamoto	Namako Umino	September 22, 2024
The news of FUG slayer candidate Viole killing Khun and destroying the Hand of Arlen spreads across the tower. Rak doesn't believe the news and goes to capture Khun. Xia Xia reveals FUG's plan to instill fear among regulars with the news and to enter the "Workshop Battle" to destroy every last E-Rank Regular. Viole obstructs the fight between Ran and Cassano and instructs Xia Xia to let Novik and Ran participate in the Workshop Battle. Viole requests Novik and Ran to participate and assures them that he is not their enemy. After the Hand of Arlen is destroyed, Khun gets left behind, but Wangnan's team rescues him by tracking Viole's Pocket. Khun takes Wangnan's team to his private bunker, only to find Getang dead and Dan heavily injured by severe stab wounds in his legs. At the hospital, while Khun contemplates everything that has happened, Hwaryun appears before him. She reveals her identity as a Guide, and she took the test in the testing floor as a task assigned by FUG. She also reveals FUG's desire for Irregular 25th Bam to kill the heads of the Ten Families and Jahad. Since only an Irregular can kill Jahad, FUG faked Bam's death on the testing floor and changed his identity to Slayer Candidate Jue Viole Grace. Khun becomes agitated upon hearing this and asks about Bam's whereabouts, but she doesn't know because only FUG Elders and a few Slayers planned the incident to bring Viole under their control by forcing him into a team they assembled. Hwaryun offers Khun to enter and win the Workshop Battle with Wangnan's team to get Viole back. Dan wakes up and requests Khun take him into the Workshop Battle too. Khun finally accepts Hwaryun's offer.
26	13	"Archimedes"; Transliteration: "Arukimedesu" (Japanese: アルキメデス)	Masahiro Takada	Takeshi Miyamoto	Shigenori Kageyama	September 29, 2024
Wangnan initially rejects joining with Khun because of his weak team and his own low personal growth since he starts climbing the tower, but Khun persuades him. Reflejo, a Fisherman from FUG, congratulates Viole for gaining the power of the Thorn (red) they prepared. Khun trains Wangnan and his team for one month for the 29th-floor test. They pass the test and become eligible to participate in the Workshop Battle. Team FUG and team Shibishu receive the invitation to participate too. Rak goes to search for Khun and Bam. A voice emits from a player and asks a man in a solid white suit, with glasses, if he had an answer to his question. The white-suited man answers not to be impatient, as the game had only just begun. Khun's team travels to the 30th floor to the Archimedes, one of the Workshop's five massive flying ships. Khun remembers his bet with Hwaryun to not reveal his and Bam's identity and them being alive during the Workshop Battle. Viole notices Workshop patrols chasing someone and goes to rescue him.
Workshop Battle
27	14	"Meeting the Traveler"; Transliteration: "Tabibito to no Deai" (Japanese: 旅人との出会い)	Kazuya Fujishiro	Riuji Yoshizaki	Masayoshi Nishida	October 6, 2024
Two Workshop patrols chase the Traveler until Viole intervenes. A level 30 robotic patrol, Blue Dog, hunts them, as stronger robots retaliate when others are destroyed. The Traveler seeks help from Emily, who directs him to D-52, where he installs a jamming device to disrupt tracking. Viole urges him to confront the patrol, but he believes only a Princess of Jahad or a Slayer Candidate can defeat them and asks Viole to help set a trap. Meanwhile, a reporter interviews Princess Endorsi, a favorite in the upcoming Workshop Battle, who vows to crush Jue Viole Grace, exciting the crowd, including Wangnan and Edin, while Khun feels embarrassed. Io, the Workshop Battle host, announces a game for boarding passes to the Archimedes, with 248 passes available. Regulars must defeat others using distributed guns, with each participant allowed one bullet. Missing a shot eliminates them, while light shots transport players to the Archimedes. The first person shot receives a "Blood Tamara", and the one sending the most participants via light shots earns a "White Heavenly Mirror". Defeating the Bongbong fairies grants a boarding pass and rare items. As the game starts, Khun targets Wangnan, who screams as the timer hits zero, attracting two Regulars. Khun traps them and takes their bullets. Meanwhile, Shibisu's team rushes to their rooms, worried about Endorsi, who has become more self-centered since Bam's death. Endorsi confronts Shibisu with paparazzi she caught and later asks Emily about Viole's location, who directs her to D-52. There, Viole introduces himself as the 25th Bam, and the Traveler explains he is pursuing the Archimedes to save someone he loves, as the grand prize of the Workshop Battle is a human being. Just then, the patrol tries to breach the door, prompting the Traveler to trigger a failed explosion. As they prepare for the attack, Endorsi breaks through the ceiling, shocking Bam.
28	15	"The Promise of That Day"; Transliteration: "Ano-hi no Yakusoku" (Japanese: あの日の約束)	Tsutomu Murakami	Erika Yoshida	Toshihiko Masuda	October 13, 2024
As Viole battles a security robot alongside the Traveller, Edorsi Jahad suddenly appears. Unaware that Viole, a FUG agent, is actually Bam, she tries to capture him. Meanwhile, Wangnan and Team Khun confront Chang and Quaetro. Viole successfully escapes from Endorsi with the Traveller. Khun manages to send Chang and Quaetro to the Archimedes in exchange for their bullets. Verdi captures Prince and Miseng. At the same time, Team Shibisu launches a surprise attack on the hotel where Team FUG is staying. Anaak Jahad engages in a fight with Ran, while Hatz faces off against Cassano, who breaks Hatz's sword. Viole interrupts in the battle between Anaak and Ran.
29	16	"The 25th Bam"; Transliteration: "Nijūgonichi no Yoru" (Japanese: 二十五日の夜)	Taiki Nishimura	Takeshi Miyamoto	Takaaki Ishiyama	October 20, 2024
Verdi, the puppet user on Shibisu's team, takes Miseng and Prince hostage. Wangnan refuses to proceed without them, so Khun helps him find them. Meanwhile, Viole sends Anaak and Ran to Archimedes using the light shots. Xia Xia informs Viole that Shibishu is in the hotel's central staircase. Viole saves Yuto from Vespa and hides his identity. Shibishu, uninterested in the Workshop Battle, only wants to defeat Viole. Verdi's octopus places a ring called Reina on Viole's finger to absorb his Shinsu and sends it underground, nullifying its power. Shibishu plans to fight Viole while limiting his Shinsu. Amigo and Vespa fights with Viole, and Yuto protects him from Vespa's poisoned needle, which he can cure with honey. Viole uses his red Thorn to defeat Vespa and Amigo, asking Shibishu honey and bullets for their release. Shibishu accepts and orders Verdi to meet at their location. Verdi refuses Wangnan's request to release Prince and Mesing, planning to make them her puppets. All FUG members, including Novik and Viole, go to Archimedes. Rak meets Khun and Wangnan, and they head to Archimedes too. Meanwhile, Endorsi chases the Traveler for information about Viole. The Traveler claims not to know him but reveals that the person he was with is the 25th Bam, surprising Endorsi.
30	17	"Funky!"; Transliteration: "Fankī!" (Japanese: ファンキー！)	Yoshitsugu Kimura	Riuji Yoshizaki	Namako Umino	October 27, 2024
Io and Punk discuss the increased earnings from the Workshop Battle due to prominent figures, using the money for research and to complete Emily. Endorsi receives a bonus ticket for catching the Traveler and Bongbong. Khun learns from Rak that Hwaryun told him about Rachel's betrayal and Bam being alive. Rak calls out Khun for being indecisive and pushes him to get Bam. Hatz follows Emily's advice and goes to Acorn Workshop, where he finds Cassano and Horyang meeting Dr. Sophia. Beta finds Hatz spying on them and catches him. Cassano traps Hatz in a room. Sophia says that Beta is Horyang and Cassano's brother, and later she shows them Emily, the subject of her research, which will become a weapon. Io and Punk, the hosts of the E-Rank Regular Workshop Battle, announce the beginning. The first game is called "Flag". The first three out of eight Regulars to put flags in the holes will advance. If they let go of the flag or drop it outside the arena, they will disqualify themselves. If fewer than three Regulars remain, the game will continue until their flags have been inserted. The game is an individual battle, but simply winning is not enough. The team leaders will bet on the game as Gamblers. The top six leaders who finish with the most points will participate in the final tournament. So, it's both an individual and a team game. Group 1 includes Wangnan, Arkraptor, Miseng, Prince, and others. As the game begins, Prince warns about Miseng, who looks infuriated.
31	18	"The Mad Dog and the Lizard"; Transliteration: "Kyōken to Tokage" (Japanese: 狂犬とトカゲ)	Taro Tanaka	Takeshi Miyamoto	Masayoshi Nishida	November 3, 2024
As soon as the game begins, Wangnan, Prince, and Akraptor must fight Miseng, who Verdi's ability has driven mad. Akraptor takes the flower from Miseng, which Verdi uses to control her. The trio passes the game. Io and Punk announce that all five groups will compete at once. Wangnan tells Viole, who watches from a distance, that he will crush FUG. The next competitor list shows Horyang and Goseng in group 4, Quaetro and Yihwa in group 5, and Yama's mad dog Varagav in group 6. Varagav kills an opponent without using baang and advances to the team tournament. Reflejo informs Viole that Varagav is a fighting dog. Slayer Baylord Yama runs a secret dog-fighting ring where warriors call themselves fighting dogs. To demonstrate strength, Baylord chooses three young fighting dogs as Regulars, including Varagav, who becomes known as the strongest E-rank Regular. One day, he quits climbing the Tower and cuts ties with FUG, now hating them and slaughtering every Regular associated with them. He comes to kill Viole, who participates in group 19 and defeats all who call him a god. Endorsi wonders about the lack of data on Viole and wants to meet him. Io announces that 48 competitors from 26 groups have advanced and reveals the final three group lists, showing Anaak and Ran in the same group.
32	19	"All In"	Yoshihiko Mori & Xu Chenyin	Riuji Yoshizaki	You Nakano	November 10, 2024
Special rules apply to Anaak and Ran's one-on-one match. Khun and Shibisu, who are gamblers, bet "all in" on Ran and Anaak, respectively. Beta, a Living Ignition Weapon created in the workshop, appears before Viole and calls him a finished product. Anaak and Ran defeat each other as Paracule interferes in their match. Emily says the grand prize of the Workshop Battle is Ignition Weapon Viole himself. Hatz tries to escape the Acorn Workshop and paralyzes a Patrol using a steel pipe. Lero Ro stops the Patrol's self-destruct and asks Hatz to help prevent the creation of the "worst weapon". At the party, Wangnan sulks over Khun's disqualification while drinking with Arkraptor, Chang, and Quaetro. He mesmerizes himself with Endorsi's beauty. Rak, after beating Paracule, heads after Viole with Yihwa. In the gamblers' meeting, every gambler except Ron Mei and Reflejo gets disqualified. Khun argues the disqualification, citing Paracule's interference. Io proposes new rules for the eight losers, calling it the Development Tournament. Viole meets Beta, who reveals that FUG has placed a replica of Thorn inside Viole, and the real weapon is in the Workshop arena. Beta tells Viole to steal the real Thorn. Khun informs Arkraptor, Wangnan, and Dan about the tournament. The winning team will face the winner between Team Mad Dog and Team FUG. Khun hopes Rak won't do anything stupid. Rak bumps into Endorsi at the FUG hotel, who recognizes him. Viole walks right into them. Rak, unable to control his emotions, hugs Viole.
33	20	"Like a Flame in the Wind"; Transliteration: "Fūzen no Tomoshibi" (Japanese: 風前の灯火)	Hideaki Uehara	Takeshi Miyamoto	Toshihiko Masuda	November 17, 2024
Endorsi grabs Rak and Yihwa, teleports with Bong Bong, and asks Viole out. Horyang dances with Goseng, hoping to return to her after the Workshop Battle. The next day, the team tournament is held on an island to determine the Workshop Battle winners. Io explains that Team Mad Dog faces Team FUG on the north side, while the other eight teams compete in the Development Tournament (DT) on the south side. The winners from both sides will fight for the grand prize. In the DT, each starter gathers points to summon allies and buy items, advancing by defeating the opponent's starter. Teams get 50,000 points every 30 minutes, 100,000 for defeating an enemy, and 500,000 for defeating the starter. Starters must move to the combat area within 30 minutes. Wangnan heads to the summoning station, but Tebo and Lebo arrive, finding a 5-minute loading time. Horyang fights with Cassano, realizing the opponents are stalling. Viole recalls Beta's warning to steal the Thorn, because FUG sends three gamblers to kill his teammates as he fights Varagav. Viole reaches the research facility with Beta's key instead of fighting Varagav. Wangnan defeats Tebo and Lebo with Khun's plan and advances to the final four. Quaetro, Arkraptor, Yihwa, and Rak are summoned as the match ends. Ron Mei reveals that Team Mad Dog, secretly aligned with FUG, deceived Viole and Novick. Horyang saves Novik and rushes to Viole's aid. Beta arrives near Viole with the kingslaying Thorn and explains that Enryu, the Irregular, killed a floor administrator long ago, shattering the belief that administrators were invincible. FUG found Enryu's Thorn at the administrator's death site. FUG thought they could use it to kill Jahad, but they couldn't, because it had already died (it was nothing but a shell). FUG then worked with the Workshop scientists to use the Ignition Weapon. The Workshop kidnapped illegitimate children to turn them into Living Ignition Weapons, after acquiring a devil that could activate the Thorn. The research aimed to give Viole the power to activate Enryu's Thorn, but a group of Slayers opposed, fearing betrayal. They decided to create an Ignition Weapon by imbuing the Thorn's shell with Viole's soul and return it to themselves. After trapping Viole, Beta pierces his chest.
34	21	"The Beginning of Dawn"; Transliteration: "Yoake no Hajimari" (Japanese: 夜明けのはじまり)	Shigeki Awai	Riuji Yoshizaki	Shigenori Kageyama	November 24, 2024
Io announces that Team Mad Dog has abandoned the match, making Team FUG the winner. Four participants, including Viole, have left Team FUG, and Ron Mei and Varagav have replaced them. A man in glasses and a white suit wonders how Viole will handle the real Thorn. Meanwhile, Miya, the snake woman, visits Khun, who is in the waiting area. Miya reveals FUG's plan to melt Bam and imbue the Enryu's Thorn's shell and discloses that she is one of the three gamblers who entered the Workshop Battle. As Khun contemplates everything, Shibisu appears before him. Relejo explains FUG's plan to Viole, who is chained and unable to use Shinsu. Hatz explains to Khun that Lero Ro snuck aboard the Archimedes, learnt about FUG's plan, and uncovered the Workshop's plan to melt living humans and create an Ignition weapon. Khun has returned his hair color to normal and resolves to save Bam (Viole). The Travellers and other prisoners break free inside the Archimedes, thanks to Lero Ro. In the next round, Khun reveals to his teammates that summoning Bam is the only way to save him while still following the rules. Khun also discloses to his teammates that, according to Emily, the three others who betrayed FUG are Horyang, Novik, and FUG's scout (Yuto), who might be on Bam's side. Yuto answers Horyang, who questions whether Khun can figure out the plan through Emily, saying that Khun is an "exceptional Regular". Khun orders Wangnan and Quaetro to go to the summoning area while Rak and Yihwa will support them by defeating the opponents and gathering points. He tells Arkraptor to remain hidden and ambush the enemies' first member at the critical moment. Meanwhile, Shibisu and Vespa will stay on standby to look for unknown opponents.
35	22	"Their Workshop"; Transliteration: "Futari no Kōbō" (Japanese: ふたりのこうぼう)	Naoki Murata	Takeshi Miyamoto	Masayoshi Nishida	December 1, 2024
Rak and Yihwa battle two of Miya's hired attackers while Wangnan and Quaetro head toward the summoning station. Devil Bon, a FUG gambler, gives a parasite named Medina, a Regular, to Beta explaining that Beta will join the tournament once he swallows it. Rak, returning to his original size, defeats the attackers with Yihwa's help and declares his intent to find Viole. Beta appears and asks about Viole, with Rak responding that Viole is his prey. Yihwa adds that she won't ally with FUG. Confused, Beta leaves. Meanwhile, Wangnan and Quaetro are ambushed by another participant. Quaetro decides to face the attacker, while Beta is confronted by Vespa. Rak and Yihwa intervene, helping Vespa. Beta realizes they plan to summon Viole. Elsewhere, Viole struggles to escape. Reflejo questions why the Elders sent Yuto and reveals he follows Karaka, his master, who plans to wield the Thorn. Yuto, revealed as Hwaryun, discloses that she and her allies have known about Reflejo's plan and pretended to be trapped to aid Viole's friends. She explains that the red Thorn in Viole's body is a vessel for Enryu's Thorn and that the moment FUG trapped Viole, the owner of Enryu's Thorn had been decided. Hwaryun escapes, and Reflejo orders Ron Mei to stop them. Novick and Horyang try to rescue Viole but are ambushed. Viole uses Shinsu to destroy the patrol, with the Thorn following him. Beta plans to inflict the same suffering on Viole that he endured. Realizing Viole has escaped, Beta rushes off. Hwaryun tells Viole the Thorn is contained, revealing that he is worthy of becoming her "God", but Viole dismisses her. She promises a reunion with his friends. As they escape, Varagav and a patrol attack. Viole uses Shinsu, which slightly triggers the Thorn, to escape. Ron Mei reveals that the teammate summoning station is broken. Khun orders Wangnan to rush to the Item Summoning Station, which was his plan all along, as Viole is both human and an item. Wangnan waits for his teammates to defeat Miya and get points, to summon Viole. Beta shows up and impales Wangnan through the chest.
36	23	"The End of Dawn"; Transliteration: "Yoake no Owari" (Japanese: 夜明けの終わり)	Manpuku Ōtsuka	Riuji Yoshizaki	Shigenori Kageyama	December 8, 2024
Akraptor, Quatero, and Vespa struggle to locate Team Snake to defeat them and earn points, as Reflejo has ordered them to leave the arena. Shibisu instructs Vespa to summon Endorsi. Meanwhile, Rak, Laure, and Yihwa arrive at the item summoning station to find Wangnan severely injured. Laure realizes that Beta had swallowed a parasite, the first member of their team, which Yihwa eliminates using her flame power, granting Team Ramenmaru enough points to summon Viole. Wangnan crawls to the pool and successfully summons Viole. Laure informs Khun that Beta has transformed into a monster due to the Workshop's experiments. Frustrated, Beta uses his partial ignition to summon Phobos and attacks everyone. Sophia arrives, pleading with Beta to stop, giving Khun hope that they might buy time as Viole's summoning nears completion. Beta, however, insists he is no longer human but a weapon for revenge, as instructed by Emily. Realizing Team Snake has quit, Khun orders Shibisu to forfeit, allowing Viole to be summoned instantly. Just then, Beta detonates the item shop, but Viole appears. He instructs Rak to take Wangnan to safety and tells Beta to cease fighting as the DT is over. Beta reveals his tragic past, explaining how he and others were forced to kill each other for the chance at "freedom." After a fierce battle, Viole easily defeats Beta using his Shinsu. In a final attempt, Beta summons Phobos again, only to be destroyed once more. Beta sarcastically congratulates Viole for having freedom, friends and power without earning it. Viole explains how he earned his friends and happiness. Sophia reveals that Beta's experiment had nothing to do with Viole. Beta suspects that Emily may have deceived him. Suddenly, Workshop guards surround Beta to kill him, but they are defeated by Akraptor, Quatero, Rak, Shibisu, and Hatz. Sophia is saved by Lero Ro, while Reflejo, having captured Hwaryun, orders Ron Mei to prepare for Viole's final battle.
37	24	"The Cost of Battle"; Transliteration: "Tatakai no Daishō" (Japanese: 戦いの代償)	Taro Tanaka & Kei Suzuki	Riuji Yoshizaki	Toshihiko Masuda	December 15, 2024
Cassano forfeits the match as part of his deal with Reflejo. Meanwhile, Rak hugs Viole (Bam) to celebrate their reunion. Yihwa gets surprised to see Viole smile. Akraptor informs Viole that Wangnan is healing in the treatment facility of the floating ship. Yihwa buys Rak a new spear, while Khun expresses concern that the true climax is still to come, as FUG Rankers remain on the ship and his team has made enemies of the Workshop. Lero Ro informs that the tournament will be put on hold due to trouble above. The hosts are shocked to find that the door to Emily's hangar is destroyed. Lero Ro reveals his plan: his allies will arrive in the participant waiting room to use the summoning station, allowing him to summon Khun's team to the ship he arrived in for an escape to the Wolhaiksong floating ship before the final match. He also reveals that Urek Mazino, the highest-ranked active Ranker and powerful enough to take on the Ten Families alone, is one of the founders of Wolhaiksong and an Irregular. Reflejo contacts Viole through Hwaryun's Pocket, threatening to kill Hwaryun, Novick, and Horyang. Viole insists on going alone to rescue them, but Khun declines, revealing that Endorsi will also be summoned. Suddenly, a red light descends from the sky, bringing Endorsi and Hatz before Ron Mei and Varagav. Lero Ro requests a 30-minute delay for the summoning to Khun Hatzling. Sophia requests Lero Ro to take Beta with them as well. Viole and Khun arrive near Thorn to find Reflejo holding Hwaryun hostage, having transformed into smoke. Reflejo reveals he is one of Poken's shadows and has power greater than a B-Rank. Madoraco notes that the information he received from Reflejo about Cassano is useful and orders preparations for a solution. Viole struggles to fight Reflejo, while Khun figures out how to combat him.
38	25	"Return of the King"; Transliteration: "Ōnokikan" (Japanese: 王の帰還)	Toshikatsu Tokoro	Takeshi Miyamoto	Toshikatsu Tokoro	December 22, 2024
39	26	"The Dawn of the Departure"; Transliteration: "Tabidachi no Yoake" (Japanese: 旅立ちの夜明け)	Hideaki Uehara	Erika Yoshida	Namako Umino	December 29, 2024
