= Come Play (song) =

- 7-inch vinyl cover

Single by Stray Kids, Young Miko and Tom Morello

from the album Arcane League of Legends: Season 2 (Soundtrack from the Animated Series)
- Language: English; Korean; Spanish
- Released: October 16, 2024
- Genre: Pop rock
- Length: 2:41
- Label: Riot Games
- Songwriters: Diego López Crespo; Dave Emerson Dahlquist; Ashley Fulton; Kami Kehoe; Tom Morello; Maria Victoria Ramirez de Arellano
- Producers: Tom Morello; Kill Dave

Stray Kids singles chronology
"Night" / "Falling Up" (2024)	"Come Play" (2024)	"Giant" (2024)

Young Miko singles chronology
"Forbidden Love" (2024)	"Come Play" (2024)	"Woahh" (2025)

Tom Morello singles chronology
"Soldier in the Army of Love" (2024)	"Come Play" (2024)	"One Last Dance" (2024)

Visualizer
- "Come Play" on YouTube

"Come Play" is a song by South Korean boy band Stray Kids, Puerto Rican rapper and singer Young Miko and American guitarist Tom Morello from the soundtrack to the second season of the adult animated steampunk action-adventure television series Arcane (2024). It was released as the second single from the album by Riot Games on October 16, 2024.

== Background and release ==
On September 12, 2024, Arcane announced the track listing for its second season's soundtrack album, which South Korean boy band Stray Kids, Puerto Rican rapper and singer Young Miko, and American guitarist Tom Morello performed the track titled "Come Play". In the press release, Stray Kids revealed that the song "has a dynamic taste to it, bringing all sorts of voices and languages together." A snippet of the song was first previewed on October 14, and the full-length was released as a second single from the soundtrack two days later, alongside the trailer that featured the song. The extended edition of the album included the Kordhell remix of "Come Play".

== Composition ==
A pop-rock track blending K-pop, hip-hop and rock styles, "Come Play" is described by Remezcla's Jeanette Hernandez as a "strong guitar-driven song with K-pop elements and [...] incomparable flow," highlighting "Stay Kids' energy and raps, Morello's guitar riffs, and Young Miko's signature rap cadence." Gregory Adams of Revolver called the song a mixing of "pop-world digi-beats" and Morello's "tone-warped guitar rhythms" with "multilingual, attitude-heavy bars from Young Miko and a few Stray Kids members".

== Credits and personnel ==
- Stray Kids – vocals
- Young Miko – vocals, writer
- Tom Morello – guitar, writer, producer
- Diego López Crespo – writer
- Dave Emerson Dahlquist – writer
- Ashley Fulton – writer
- Kami Kehoe – writer
- Kill Dave – producer
- Sebastien Najand – additional producer
- Tom Norris – mixing
- Joe LaPorta – mastering

== Charts ==
Chart performance for "Come Play"
Chart (2024)	Peak position
France (SNEP)	180
South Korea Download (Circle)	159
UK Physical Singles (OCC)	31

== Release history ==
Release dates and formats for "Come Play"
Region	Date	Format	Version	Label	Ref.
Various	October 16, 2024	Digital download; streaming	Original	Riot Games	
Italy	October 16, 2024	Radio airplay	Original	Riot Games; Virgin	
Various	December 6, 2024	7-inch vinyl	Original	Riot Games	
Various	April 4, 2025	Digital download; streaming	Kordhell remix	Riot Games	
