= Fantasy War Tactics =

2015 video game

- Game logo
- Developer: Nexon GT
- Publisher: Nexon
- Platforms: iOS; Android
- Release: November 5, 2015
- Genre: Strategic Role-Playing game
- Mode: Multiplayer online game

Fantasy War Tactics is a free-to-play mobile strategic role-playing game with in-app purchase, developed by Nexon GT and published by Nexon. The game ran its global beta stage on April 30, 2015 and was globally released on November 5, 2015 for both iOS and Android platforms, available in 154 countries.

== Gameplay ==
Combat in Fantasy War Tactics featuring an isometric grid-based battlefield.

Fantasy War Tactics is a classic SRPG with a vast map of 12 regions and 180 dungeons to explore, a PvP system, and more than 50 heroes to choose from. Fantasy War Tactics features an isometric grid-based strategic battle system. Players will deploy character units called Heroes, on the battlefield, taking turns to defeat opponents.

The game also features 4 tactical mechanics that may affect the tides of battle: Cooperation, Advantage, Terrain, and Direction.

- Cooperation happens whenever executing an attack on a target. If an ally is within the attack range, they will also join the assault, further increasing the damage to the target.
- Advantage happens when attacking a target whose property is weaker. This is determined by the Rock-Paper-Scissors system, wherein rock units deals extra damage to scissors units, scissors to paper, and paper to rock.
- Terrain is whenever executing an attack on a tile that is advantageous to the hero. Each hero has a specialized terrain that increases the damage output of his attack to the target. During the hero's turn, the specified tile(s) will be raised to distinguish the advantageous terrain.
- Direction increases damage to the target whenever attacking it from a direction other than the side it is facing.

=== Heroes ===
Heroes are the playable characters in the game. They will serve as the Lord's companions throughout his journey of conquering the world. The game currently features 51 heroes, each with a distinct set of abilities and skill sets. Heroes are categorized by their Property (i.e., Rock, Paper, and Scissors) and Battle-type (i.e., Attack, Area-Attack, Balance, Defense, and Support). Heroes can be obtained by collecting their genetic fragments (or gene fragments) through the following methods: defeating them at their stages, participating in certain events, or buying them at the in-game shop using the game's currencies. After successfully recruiting a hero, the gene fragments can further be used for enhancing hero's skills.

=== Player versus Player ===
Fantasy War Tactics has two game modes to promote interaction between players via a PvP (or Player Versus Player) scenario. The two game modes are Battle of Honor and Dimensional Breakthrough.

Battle of Honor is a PvP-oriented game mode where players put up a team of 4 heroes to battle other players' teams and climb through the ladder determined by your Honor Points. Winning battles will increase your Honor Points while defeats will incur losses. Battle of Honor is formatted into seasons. Each season, players will have their Honor Points reset and are given a chance to climb up the ladder again. A season lasts for a week and every start of a new season, participants are handed out the rewards from the previous one. Rewards include are in the form of the in-game currency (i.e., Gold, Honor Medals) and the game's premium currency (i.e., Crystals) with an increasing amount based on how high the rank in the ladder is.

The stages inside Dimensional Breakthrough, each level players must defeat another player's team in order to proceed to the next stage.

Dimensional Breakthrough is a survival scheme PvP game mode wherein players will go through a series of battles called Virtual Stages. Unlike Battle of Honor, heroes will not heal up completely and heroes who completely lose all of their HP can no longer participate in the subsequent stages. Also, Dimensional Breakthrough rewards participating players after winning a stage.

== Development ==
Fantasy War Tactics is a mobile SRPG developed by director Jung Keun Lee from Solar department of Nexon GT. Additionally, Sung Eun Jo and Hyo Jin Lim took part in main game design, Jy Chul Shin as the art leader and Su Hwan Jang as the programming leader. The game's first development stage goes back to 2013, when they started with the thought of bringing the console's SRPG to the mobile platform. In August 2015, the game went soft-launched in four different countries (Australia, Malaysia, Netherlands, Finland) with just a bit more than 20 project members. On the November 5th of 2015, the game started launching globally over 150 countries, not including Japan and China.

== Reception ==
Fantasy War Tactics

Review scores
Publication	Score
148Apps	4/5
Gamezebo	3.5/5

Gamezebo's Rob Rich gave 3.5 out of 5 to the game, commenting "Fantasy War Tactics is a pretty darned entertaining strategy RPG." He wrote that there is always a plenty of contents to do for the players without too much promotion of premium or in-app purchases. However, he also felt that the difficulty spike of higher-LEL dungeons makes the grind part of the game quite noticeable. He added that grind part of the game can sometime become tiring even with the auto function during battles. In short, he concluded that Fantasy War Tactics can get tiring and difficult from time to time, but it is still a good game with pretty graphics and good amount of contents to be enjoyed.

148App's Nadia Oxford was quite impressed with the game, scoring the game 4 out of 5. She wrote, "Fantasy War Tactics gameplay should feel familiar to genre enthusiasts" and "Fantasy War Tactics battles are brisk and engaging." However, she also added "but it makes you all the more aware of the game's stamina counter, which depletes quite rapidly." She concluded "Fantasy War Tactics isn't on the same level as Final Fantasy Tactics, but it's not a low-tier offering, either. If you're into strategy games, give it a go."
