= Tower of God season 1 =

First season of the anime TV series

Tower of God
- Season 1
- Blu-ray cover for the first season
- No. of episodes: 13

Release
- Original network: Tokyo MX
- Original release: April 1 – June 24, 2020

Season chronology
- Next → Season 2

Tower of God is an anime television series based on S.I.U.'s manhwa series of the same name. The anime adaptation was initially announced at Seoul Comic-Con in August 2019. The series, titled Kami no Tō -Tower of God- (神之塔 -Tower of God-), began releasing in April 2020 simultaneously in Japan, South Korea, and the United States. The first season was produced by Telecom Animation Film, with Aniplex subsidiary Rialto Entertainment responsible for Japanese production, and Sola Entertainment providing production management. The series premiered on April 1, 2020, on South Korea's Naver Series On and television network Aniplus, and in Japan from April 2 to June 24, 2020, on Tokyo MX and other networks. (Note: The first two episodes received an early release on Naver Series On at 20:00 KST April 1 and 8, 2020. Subsequent Korean-dubbed episodes premiered at 23:00 KST, and subsequent Japanese-dubbed episodes aired at 24:30 JST, which is effectively 00:30 JST the following day.) The season was directed by Takashi Sano, with Hirokazu Hanai as assistant director, Erika Yoshida in series composition, Masashi Kudo and Miho Tanino in character designs.

Season 1 follows 25th Bam, a boy who enters this tower in search of his friend Rachel. As he ascends, he faces challenges, meets allies, and discovers the tower's mysterious nature. The journey is filled with friendship, betrayal, and power struggles. The anime describes itself in the episodes as the story of the beginning and the end of Rachel, the girl who climbed the tower so she could see the stars, and Bam, the boy who needed nothing but her.

Kevin Penkin composed the soundtrack. The opening theme song is "Top", while the ending theme song is "Slump"; both are performed by the K-pop band Stray Kids in Japanese, English, and Korean for the respective language dubs.

Crunchyroll streamed the Japanese broadcast of the series as a co-production under its "Crunchyroll Originals" label.

== Episodes ==
Note: All episodes from this season were written by Erika Yoshida

No. overall	No. in season	Title	Directed by	Storyboarded by	Chief animation directed by	Original release date
1	1	"Ball" (Note: Stylized in all caps)	Takashi Sano	Takashi Sano	Miho Tanino	April 1, 2020
A girl named Rachel tells a boy named Bam to forget about her as she climbs the tower to see the stars, disappearing into the gates. Bam suddenly finds himself transported to the first floor of the tower, where he meets its caretaker, Headon. Headon explains that all who wish to climb the tower must pass through a series of tests, one on each floor. Before he can enter the cage, however, he is interrupted by a girl named Yuri and her companion Evan, who gift him a special Pocket that holds information about the tower. Yuri also lends Bam a powerful sword known as Black March, which can be either dull or extremely sharp depending on the user's intentions. Bam, having deciphered the true nature of the test as a challenge to see whether participants dare to embrace death, lets himself be eaten by the eel. However, as Black March is unable to be wielded by him, Evan suggests that he request its strength, allowing Bam to break the ball and be transported to the next floor. To retrieve her sword, Yuri decides to follow him. On the second floor, Bam is greeted by 399 other contestants, with the next test being a killing match to whittle the number down to 200.
2	2	"3/400"; Transliteration: "Yonhyaku-bun no San" (Japanese: 400分の3)	Hirokazu Hanai	Hirokazu Hanai	Miho Tanino	April 8, 2020
Bam recalls his past, specifically the time he was an amnesiac, alone in a dark cave, until Rachel found him and took care of him, teaching him about the world and how to read and write. On the second floor, Bam encounters two other contestants, Khun Aguero Agnis and Rak Wraithraiser. Both of them recognize the Black March due to a symbol on its hilt, which sparks Khun's interest and fuels Rak's determination to hunt Bam down in order to become stronger. Khun forms an alliance with Bam, and at the last second, he manages to rope Rak in when the next test requires teams of three to be formed among the participants. On the mothership, test administrator and Ranker (someone who has climbed the tower before) Lero Ro challenges them to withstand his water barrier, which he forms using the tower's power, known as Shinsu. All but Bam, who remains standing due to what appears to be good luck, are pushed back by the Shinsu. As Lero Ro leaves after the test, he warns Bam to be cautious around Khun. The victors are taken to another room for the third test. As the groups filter in, a mysterious blonde figure catches sight of Khun and recognizes him.
3	3	"The Correct Door"; Transliteration: "Seikai no Tobira" (Japanese: 正解の扉)	Rokusuke Okimitsu	Takashi Sano	Miho Tanino	April 15, 2020
In the new venue, Khun explains to a wonderstruck Bam that the "sky" here is actually an imitation created by Shinsu, modeled after a legend that he doubts is true. They meet the director of the test, Hansung Yu, who challenges them to find the correct door out of twelve identical ones within 10 minutes, with only one chance to succeed, or risk being forcefully terminated. Although Khun tries to think, he is suddenly haunted by memories of his past, specifically the betrayal by his half-sister Maria, who was chosen to become one of the elite girls, a Princess of Jahad, with his help, resulting in the exile of the Aguero family. His mother had also warned him since then to never trust anyone and to keep his heart closed off. As Khun panics, Rak pushes open a random door, and Hansung reveals that the hidden condition to pass was actually to open any door within 5 minutes. Lero Ro then administers a bonus test, where participation is voluntary, but all who pass it will be automatically granted permission to climb the tower. The test involves five rounds where a maximum of five teams attempt to steal a crown and remain on the throne for as long as possible, with two other members of the team acting as defense. As the second round begins, Bam feels Black March react strangely as a girl who bears a striking resemblance to Rachel arrives.
4	4	"The Green April"; Transliteration: "Midori no Shigatsu" (Japanese: 緑の四月)	Masahiko Murata	Masahiko Murata	Miho Tanino	April 22, 2020
As the second round begins, Khun and Lauroe, a man from another team, quickly deduce that the person sitting on the throne is always at a disadvantage, as more and more teams fight for the crown. However, Khun decides not to participate just yet, as Anaak Jahad, a lizard-like girl, currently holds the crown and possesses immense power through her weapon, Green April, which is part of the 13 Month Series of Ignition Weapon swords. This series of swords is so powerful that it is only bestowed upon the Princesses of Jahad, including Yuri and Anaak. Anaak makes a bet with Bam: if his team can win the game, she will give him her sword, but if they lose, he will have to give his sword to her, and if he refuses to participate, she will kill him and steal the sword after the game. As Lauroe's team flees back into their waiting room and Anaak's team trespasses, they are disqualified from the game. Khun uses his cloning bag to pull off a series of tricks and earns the crown first, with Bam safely on the throne. Meanwhile, a mysterious and ruthless team prepares to enter the game, including Rachel, who agrees to kill everyone.
5	5	"The Crown's Fate"; Transliteration: "Okan no Yukue" (Japanese: 王冠の行方)	Yasuro Tsuchiya	Hirokazu Hanai	Miho Tanino	April 29, 2020
Khun creates countless copies of the crown and releases three other participants he had allied with during the second round from his bottomless bag. The next round proceeds with the mysterious team entering the game, proving to be extremely powerful. Bam recognizes Rachel and jumps to protect her when she is attacked by a female masked player, and in the process, both of them are struck on the head and fall to the floor. As Bam vows to protect her, a strange explosion of Shinsu erupts, making it appear as if Bam had transformed into Shinsu itself and willingly attacked the player - a phenomenon that goes against the unbiased and absolute rules of the tower. The crown game ends without a victor, as the crown is melted due to the extreme power release and Bam had left the throne during the game. Due to his serious head injury, Bam is admitted to the infirmary. Later, Rachel pays him a visit, where she meets Khun and begins to ask for a favour. Meanwhile, Lero Ro approaches Hansung, questioning his reasons for having him administer this bonus round. Hansung cautions that as administrators, their role is to prevent anyone potentially dangerous from claiming the tower's power, with Bam hinted to be one such individual.
6	6	"Position Selection"; Transliteration: "Pojishon Wake" (Japanese: ポジション分け)	Hiroaki Kudō	Takashi Sano	Miho Tanino	May 6, 2020
Five days have passed since the crown game, and Rachel requests that Khun lie to Bam, telling him that she was never there, in an attempt to prevent both of them from becoming each other's burdens. However, Khun quickly sees that Rachel doesn't really care about Bam and is trying to distance them from each other, so he fulfills her request, albeit with his own motivations. Meanwhile, Anaak steals the Black March, but the sword refuses to listen to her, rendering it useless in her hands. After Bam reawakens, Khun informs him that Lero Ro has assigned them all positions in their teams to start the fourth test: Fisherman (Close quarter combat), Spear Bearer (Attacking from distance), Lighthouse Bearer (Illuminating the tower and information gathering), Scout (observing the enemy's movement and assisting the Fisherman), and Wave Controller (supporting and controlling the battle with Shinsu). Bam receives the Wave Controller position, a role that utilizes Shinsu to support team members. However, in order to use Shinsu above its limits, contracts must be formed with the floor masters using their Pockets, but Bam is warned by the floor bearers that receiving the contract will only shackle him. Everyone works hard to pass their classes. During mealtimes, Bam meets Endrosi Jahad, a Princess of Jahad in her own right, who labels Anaak as an impostor. Khun later discovers that although Anaak was supposedly made a Princess of Jahad after climbing the tower, she is currently in the midst of passing the tower's tests, and records claim her to be deceased. As an enraged Anaak and Endrosi battle in their class, the current Anaak is revealed to be the real Princess's daughter, whose parents were killed by the other Princesses, prompting her to enter the tower for revenge.
7	7	"Lunch and Tag"; Transliteration: "Gohan to Onigokko" (Japanese: ご飯と鬼ごっこ)	Juria Matsumura	Takashi Sano	Kensuke Ishikawa	May 13, 2020
Jahad is the first man to have ever climbed the tower and become the king of all who live in it today. Endorsi likens the Princesses of Jahad to luxurious shoes in a display cabinet - once they are granted Jahad's power, they are forbidden to do certain things, such as engaging in intercourse and bearing children, in order to prevent the inheritance of Jahad's power. Their fight ends with both Endorsi and Anaak falling into a pit and suffering serious injuries. In the final placement test, participants (all but Rak and Ghost, who have already passed) are required to play a game of tag in a separate building. The participants are split into Team A and Team B, with each team's members required to help their own "it" steal the badge from the other team's "it" or reach the goal.
8	8	"Khun's Strategy"; Transliteration: "Kun no Sakuryaku" (Japanese: クンの策略)	Hikaru Sato	Hirokazu Hanai	Miho Tanino	May 20, 2020
Khun's strategy is to delay Quant long enough so that Anaak, their secret "it", can make it out the bridge and pass the test. When Quant reaches the bridge, he finds Khun instead of Anaak. Khun lies that Anaak jumped off the bridge, but in reality, she is safely floating on a lighthouse under the bridge, which Quant eventually figures out. Quant jumps down the bridge, forcing Khun with him in an attempt to get his lighthouse to fall, but Khun is saved by Anaak, who uses the Green April as a vine rope to pull him to safety. Down the bridge, Quant surprisingly finds Khun and Lauroe, who offer him a ride up the bridge to steal Anaak's badge. It is later revealed that Khun betrayed his own team so that his friends, especially Bam, on Team B could pass the test. With Team A losing the game, Team B enters next. Unlike Team A, who established their roles clearly and quickly, Team B fights among themselves over who will be "it". Endorsi herself declares that she will be "it". Serena's backstory is revealed: she was once a burglar, and one night she watched as her friends were killed by a Ranker, which led to her becoming a Regular. In the present time, Quant catches up to Endorsi and her team, and she shockingly seems to turn against her team as well.
9	9	"The One-Horned Ogre"; Transliteration: "Katakaku no Oni" (Japanese: 片角の鬼)	Yuichiro Yano	Takashi Sano	Miho Tanino	May 27, 2020
Endorsi reveals her true intentions: to kill the other two Fishermen on Team B in order to assure her own passage of the test. Bam rushes to Rachel's side and, along with Quant, discovers that Hoh is holding Rachel hostage at knifepoint. Hoh reveals that he has discovered Bam's motivation for climbing the tower and intends to use Rachel as leverage to pass the test, having uncovered this information through an anonymous letter. Rachel tries to break free from Hoh's hold, but he accidentally stabs her in the back. To Quant's amazement, Bam uses a Shinsu technique that took him hundreds of years to master to paralyze Hoh and recover Rachel, who is now bleeding badly. Hoh, realizing he was set up and overcome with grief at his own powerlessness, takes the knife and stabs himself through the chest, killing himself. Serena and Endorsi arrive at the scene, and Endorsi uses a weapon taken from one of the Fishermen she presumably killed to attack Quant. With Bam's help, Endorsi recovers Quant's badge, and Team B wins. Hoh's corpse and Rachel are taken to emergency care, and the episode ends with Bam sitting at Rachel's bedside, waiting for her to recover.
10	10	"Beyond the Sadness"; Transliteration: "Kanashimi no Saki ni" (Japanese: 悲しみの先に)	Yasuro Tsuchiya	Takashi Sano	Miho Tanino	June 3, 2020
Bam reveals to Khun and Rak that Rachel may never walk again due to her injury. Bam invites his peers to a small funeral set up for Hoh, and they hold a remembrance party for him later that night. Feeling that she won't pass the latest test and that her purpose is no longer there, Serena decides to leave the Inner Tower, giving Shibisu her knife as a parting gift. Test director Hansung Yu runs into Wave Controller teacher Yuga, who is holding a secret call, and reveals that his true identity is Lo Po Bia Ren, a member of the Royal Enforcement Division. Ren is on a mission to retrieve the Green April and possibly destroy the false princess - the second Anaak Jahad. Yu unexpectedly allows Ren to pursue his mission. The next morning, the participants learn of their overall test results and whether they passed or not. Hansung Yu announces that, due to her injury in the last test, Rachel has failed. In an attempt to save her status, Khun asks for permission to take the administrator's test. Yu reminds him that only Irregulars have the power to consult with the administrator, prompting Bam to reveal that he is an Irregular. This revelation surprises many of the participants. Bam is then taken to the administrator in order to speak with him.
11	11	"Underwater Hunt (Part 1)"; Transliteration: "Sengyo Kari (Zenpen)" (Japanese: 潜魚狩り (前編))	Kanji Miyake	Takashi Sano	Miho Tanino & Kensuke Ishikawa	June 10, 2020
After consulting with the administrator, Bam successfully obtains permission to take the administrator's test, with the condition that if he passes, Rachel will be allowed to move on. For the test, Bam and Rachel are placed into an underwater Shinsu ball along with fish and must be captured by net dolphins and eaten by their queen to pass. The remaining participants must stop the net dolphins' enemies - the goblins, who control marsh worms, and striped ground pigs - from interfering with the net dolphins. They must also watch out for The Bull, a mysterious and dangerous creature that eats almost anything that moves. In the caves, Shibisu runs into The Bull after receiving a warning from Hatz that the two participants who were with him have gone missing. Shibisu is saved by Anaak and Endorsi, who arrive just in the nick of time. However, the two start competing and betting against each other to see who will defeat The Bull first, showcasing their rivalry and determination. The Bull, however, runs off, and Endorsi and Anaak follow, leading them to become separated. Endorsi runs into The Bull, which is now stronger, and she is left nearly unconscious. Anaak, on the other hand, runs into Lo Po Bia Ren, who stabs her through the torso. Ren is now controlling The Bull, and it brings a captured Endorsi to him, who is ordered by Ren to kill Anaak, the imposter princess. Meanwhile, Hatz, Rak, and Paracule are keeping an eye on the goblins. Khun instructs them to wait before moving in, but there are more of them than expected. As one of the goblins prepares to attack Hatz, Paracule reflexively skewers it with his spear, prompting the rest of the goblins to attack.
12	12	"Underwater Hunt (Part 2)"; Transliteration: "Sengyo Kari (Kōhen)" (Japanese: 潜魚狩り (後編))	Hirokazu Hanai	Hirokazu Hanai	Miho Tanino & Kensuke Ishikawa	June 17, 2020
After initially retreating from the goblins, Rak turns around to attack them, joined by others from the team. Meanwhile, Lauroe follows Khun's orders and seals several underground tunnels, leading the striped ground pigs to the goblins. The two enemies engage in a fierce battle, allowing Bam and Rachel safe passage. Underground, Anaak is nearly defeated by Lo Po Bia Ren, but Endorsi surprisingly chooses to fight alongside her, putting aside their rivalry for the time being. Together, they are still not powerful enough to defeat Lo Po Bia Ren, but just as they are about to be overwhelmed, Princess Yuri arrives and recognizes her blade, which she had loaned to Bam. Annoyed with the situation, she works with her team to kill Lo Po Bia Ren. As he dies, he laughs maniacally, admitting that during the fight, he had sent the bull to kill Bam and Rachel. The bull arrives underwater, intent on killing them, and gets several good hits before Bam uses his special Shinsu to defeat the bull. As they rise upward, on the verge of completing the test successfully, Rachel suddenly stands up and pushes Bam over the edge, leaving his fate uncertain.
13	13	"Tower of God"; Transliteration: "Kami no Tō" (Japanese: 神之塔)	Takashi Sano & Masahiko Murata	Takashi Sano	Miho Tanino & Minoko Takasu	June 24, 2020
Rachel's backstory is revealed, showing her desperation to become special. She believed the tower was calling for her, but when she arrived, Headon tells her that the tower did not call her at all and that she is too weak to enter. Desperate to become special, she begs for any kind of chance. Headon holds her immobile and she watches as Bam arrives and is able to defeat the first test. She is consumed by jealousy, feeling overshadowed by Bam's natural abilities and wanting to be special herself. Headon gives her a special test, telling her that she will be allowed to climb if she kills Bam with her own hands. She demands a special advantage, feeling that Bam had been given an unfair edge with his powerful sword, and Headon gives her a bodyguard that will die in her place once, essentially giving her two lives. She makes her way through the tower, knowing that she must kill Bam but unable to bring herself to do it. She becomes increasingly conflicted, torn between her desire to eliminate Bam and her growing feelings of guilt and unease. She is told that if she waits long enough and follows the signs given, she'll be given a chance to kill him. So she allows herself to be taken by Hoh and uses the bodyguard to die and return, manipulating events to her advantage. She waits until Bam is injured, then pushes him into the Shinsu lake to kill him. When the others find her alone, she lies about what happened, telling them that the bull came and attacked Bam, and then passes out, faking innocence. Everyone assumes Bam is killed and decides that as a favor to him, they will help Rachel reach the top. Rachel, resting in her room after the trial, laughs wildly, then covers her face, conflicted over what she's done but still determined to reach the top. After everyone leaves for the next level, Bam wakes up in a deep cavern, badly hurt, and remembers Rachel pushing him. He decides he needs to climb the tower in order to find his own answers.

== Music ==
The soundtrack for the first season was composed by Kevin Penkin and released on October 16, 2020.

=== Track listing ===
All lyrics are written by Kevin Penkin; all music is composed by Kevin Penkin.

Disc 1
No.	Title	Lyrics	Music	Length
1.	"Ignition"			2:22
2.	"Irregular God"			4:27
3.	"Church"			2:46
4.	"Summit"			2:45
5.	"Rachel"			2:47
6.	"The Bubble in Wine Glass"			3:14
7.	"Stars"			2:59
8.	"Guardian"			2:30
9.	"Ma"			2:54
10.	"The Lighthouse & the Fisherman"			2:17
11.	"Chamber"			3:51
12.	"Shinsu"	feeding | ear	feeding | ear	6:02
13.	"25+Light"	Raj Ramayya	Raj Ramayya	3:57
14.	"3/400"			2:10
15.	"The Bull"			3:56
16.	"Lotus"	James Landino & Raj Ramayya	James Landino & Raj Ramayya	3:01
17.	"Aquarium"			3:11
18.	"Lero Ro"	Jeremy Lim	Jeremy Lim	2:55
19.	"Alita"			3:06
20.	"The Burning House by the Lake"			4:07

All lyrics are written by Kevin Penkin; all music is composed by Kevin Penkin.

Disc 2
No.	Title	Lyrics	Music	Length
1.	"Rebels"			2:31
2.	"Beserker Bam"			2:56
3.	"Examiner"	Raj Ramayya	Raj Ramayya	5:08
4.	"Prisoners"	Mason Lieberman	Mason Lieberman	2:33
5.	"Rak"			3:33
6.	"Glitchkick"			3:23
7.	"Black March"			2:24
8.	"Crown Game"			2:59
9.	"Khun"	Ben Mathews	Ben Mathews	3:27
10.	"Chrysanthemum"			2:44
11.	"Interlude Mirrors"			1:43
12.	"Door Test"			3:31
13.	"Two Cathedrals"			2:15
14.	"Neon Plastic Bag"			2:02
15.	"Facing the Enemy"	feeding | ear	feeding | ear	5:06
16.	"Wolf"			2:42
17.	"Time"			2:48
18.	"Silent"			2:37
19.	"Birdsong"			3:29
20.	"GodSuite I "White Steel Eel""			1:53
21.	"GodSuite II "Anaak""	feeding | ear	feeding | ear	2:24
22.	"GodSuite III "Green April""			2:24
23.	"GodSuite IV "Endorsi""			3:14
24.	"The 25th Bam"	Raj Ramayya	Raj Ramayya	3:08

== Home media release ==
Viz Media licensed the series for home video distribution in North America and released it on Blu-ray on January 18, 2022.
