= Tower of God =

South Korean webtoon

- First volume cover, featuring Twenty-Fifth Bam

신의 탑 RR: Sinui tap MR: Sinŭi t'ap
- Genre: Action, dark fantasy
- Author: S.I.U. (Lee Jong-hui)
- Publisher: Young Com
- Country of origin: South Korea
- Webtoon service: Naver Webtoon (Korean); Line Webtoon (English)
- Original run: June 30, 2010 – present
- Volumes: 20
- Anime television series
- Directed by: Takashi Sano (S1); Kazuyoshi Takeuchi (chief) (S2); Akira Suzuki (S2)
- Produced by: Joseph Chou
- Written by: Erika Yoshida
- Music by: Kevin Penkin
- Studio: Telecom Animation Film (S1); The Answer Studio (S2)
- Licensed by: Crunchyroll; NA: Viz Media (home video; S1 only); SEA: Plus Media Networks Asia (S1 only)
- Original network: Tokyo MX, KBS Kyoto, SUN; BS11, GYT, GTV (S1 only); BS NTV (S2 only)
- English network: SEA: Aniplus Asia (S1 only)
- Original run: April 1, 2020 – December 29, 2024
- Episodes: 39

Tower of God (Korean: 신의 탑) is a South Korean manhwa released as a webtoon written and illustrated by S.I.U. It has been serialized in Naver Corporation's webtoon platform Naver Webtoon since June 2010, with the individual chapters collected and published by Young Com in 20 volumes as of January 2026. Tower of God received official English translations by Line Webtoon beginning in July 2014.

It has received several mobile game adaptations and merchandise. In Japan, the web manhwa received an anime television series adaptation by Telecom Animation Film that first premiered on Naver Series On in South Korea, and aired in Japan immediately afterward. It originally aired from April to June 2020. A second season produced by The Answer Studio aired from July to December 2024.

== Synopsis ==
=== Premise ===
Tower of God centers around a boy named Twenty-Fifth Bam. (Note: In Korea 'Bam' can mean 'night' or 'chestnut'. The character's name in the anime's Japanese version is Yoru (夜), which means 'night'.) He has spent most of his life trapped beneath a vast and mysterious Tower, with only his close friend, Rachel, to keep him company. When Rachel enters the Tower, Bam is devastated. Somehow, Bam manages to open the door to the Tower. Now, he will go any distance to see Rachel again even if it means dying. When he enters the Tower, he meets allies that will help him up the tower.

=== Locations ===
==== The Tower ====
"The Tower" is a mysterious structure that is completely enclosed and hosts many unique environments. It is permeated by an element called "Shinsu", which has strange properties similar to magic in other comic universes. It is inhabited by many different intelligent species. Living on the top floors is associated with a higher status in the Tower and better living conditions. This is because ascension from one floor to the next is only allowed by passing increasingly difficult tests of strength, dexterity and wit. Regulars are any individuals from the Outer Tower chosen to climb the tower in the Inner Tower. Former Regulars who reach the top of the Tower are known as Rankers, and are generally much more powerful than others. Rankers are often put to work administering the lower floors. At the top of the Tower sit the "Ten Great Families", which form the governing body of the Tower. A figure known as King Jahad (or 'Zahard', in some translations) is the chief leader of this body.

Each floor is composed of three layers: an external Outer Tower which serves as the residential area, an Inner Tower where people are tested, and a Middle Area, which acts as a network linking each floor. Residents of each floor are given the chance to ascend, provided that they are deemed "worthy" of doing so by Headon, the First Floor's Guardian and caretaker of the Tower. Such people are referred to as "Chosen Regulars" in Tower of God. The Tower is sealed from the vast, unknown "Outside" by portentous, impenetrable doors. On rare occasions, extraordinary people are able to open the doors and enter the Tower. Such people are called "Irregulars" in the manhwa, and Twenty-Fifth Bam is one of them.

According to the author, each floor is the size of the North American continent. Each floor often has its own culture, language and governance systems, and it is not uncommon to have nations living in isolation and unaware of the existence of the tower.

Only Irregulars are exempt from the contract Jahad struck with the Tower Guardians that made him immortal. Thus, only an Irregular can kill Jahad. This fact drives much of the plot in Tower of God.

==== Shinsu ====
Shinsu (신수; Sinsu), roughly translated as "Divine Water", is a substance found within the Tower in varying concentrations on each floor. On the lower floors, Shinsu is diffuse and inconspicuous, similar to air. However, on higher floors, Shinsu increases in power and concentration, and is said to be viscous and flowing similarly to water. High Shinsu resistance is required to enter these floors. Residents in the tower must form a contract with the "guardian" of the respective floors in order to manipulate Shinsu.

Shinsu can be manipulated to enhance physical abilities, powerful weapons, and even manipulate the elements. Bang (Korean-방) is the number of discrete units of Shinsu control. The more Bangs someone handle, the better the ability to control shinsu. The size of the units is called Myeon (Korean-면), and the concentration is called Soo (Korean-수). Though used with varying degrees of explicitness and even conscious awareness, its use seems to be inextricable from combat within the Tower. Shinsu reinforcement (Korean-신수강화-shinsooganghwa) is a technique used to strengthen the body, and is commonly used by Regulars. Those who are strong with Shinsu have their aging slowed to the point where they become effectively immortal. It is unclear to what extent aging is slowed simply by living in the tower without training to use Shinsu.

Shinsu does not have a fixed flow, but there is a temporary flow. Using this flow to attack is called flow control. Expert wave controllers could destroy a village with this. Reverse flow control is used to strike back in the direction of the flow and to stop the opponent. Sometimes they are used simultaneously, attacking with flow control and protecting the body with reverse flow control. Flow control is a favored technique of Twenty-Fifth Bam.

However, there are certain exceptions to rules regarding Shinsu. Individuals known as "Irregulars" seem to have a special connection with the tower, being able to use Shinsu with little to no constraints, regardless of whether or not they have contracts with the same administrators of the floors they're on or going to. One highly notable irregular known simply as "Enryu" even managed to kill the then administrator and guardian of the 43rd floor, a feat once thought to be impossible on the apparently false pretense that Administrators were thought to be immortal and otherwise infallible. This has led many of the tower's inhabitants to see irregulars as little more than highly destructive entities with unfathomable powers and abilities, as well as being regarded as calamities brought forth by the tower's prophecies in an effort to bring about change to the tower.

Because of their ability, irregulars are often heavily stigmatized and feared, even by inhabitants of the highest caliber within the tower known simply as "Rankers". Individuals that have reached the highest floor known to the tower's inhabitants. The current capabilities of Irregulars is such that even the upper echelon of Rankers known as "High Rankers" such as the Ten Great Families and even King Jahad, are extremely wary of them, especially so in King Jahad's case due to the nature of his contract with the Tower Guardians.

==== Positions ====
Most battles in the tower are done in teams. Each person in a team plays a certain role in battle, which are referred to as positions. There are five basic positions: fisherman (낚시꾼 nakksiggun), spear-bearer (창지기 changjigi), light-bearer (등대지기 deungdaejigi), scout (탐색꾼 tamsaekggun), and wave-controller (파도잡이 padojabi). Fishermen are direct fighters, spear-bearers are a fighting support class, light-bearers provide distant reconnaissance, scouts provide on-ground reconnaissance, and wave-controllers control Shinsu. There are other positions, such as guide, but they are rare.

== Development ==
Author S.I.U. majored in visual arts education on a university level before being conscripted into the South Korean military. By the advice of a senior in the army, S.I.U. started drawing cartoons. During this period, S.I.U. drew "ten books" worth of practice cartoons, which formed the backbone of the Tower of God comic he later started to create for the Internet. S.I.U. already has major events and characters planned out, sometimes more than 8 years in advance, and often shares additional information on the Tower of God universe on his blogpost, after each chapter is published.

== Media ==
=== Manhwa ===
Lee Jong-hui (Korean: 이종휘), also known by the pen-name S.I.U. ("Slave In Utero") launched Tower of God in Naver's webtoon platform Naver Webtoon on June 30, 2010. It is the first story in the "Talse Uzer" universe. As of February 2020, Tower of God has collected 4.5 billion views worldwide. Tower of God was one of the first webtoons to receive official English translations by Line Webtoon in July 2014.

Its first and second collected volumes were released simultaneously by Young Com on November 12, 2019.

In November 2021, Wattpad announced that Tower of God would receive a print release in North America as part of their new Webtoon Unscrolled imprint.

==== Volumes ====
No.	Korean release date	Korean ISBN
1	November 12, 2019	979-1-19-015317-1
2	November 12, 2019	979-1-19-015318-8
3	May 26, 2020	979-1-19-015329-4
4	May 26, 2020	979-1-19-015330-0
5	January 12, 2021	979-1-19-015361-4
6	January 12, 2021	979-1-19-015362-1
7	July 14, 2021	979-1-19-015393-5
8	July 14, 2021	979-1-19-015394-2
9	March 29, 2022	979-1-16-779073-6
10	July 28, 2022	979-1-16-779140-5
11	November 23, 2022	979-1-16-779140-5
12	March 23, 2023	979-1-16-779216-7
13	July 20, 2023	979-1-16-779265-5
14	January 30, 2024	979-1-16-779376-8
15	May 27, 2024	979-1-16-779424-6
16	July 31, 2024	979-1-16-779449-9
17	October 29, 2024	979-1-16-779477-2
18	January 23, 2025	979-1-16-779501-4
19	July 14, 2025	979-1-16-779604-2
20	January 30, 2026	979-1-16-779621-9

=== Video games ===
In 2013, Naver released a mobile role-playing game on Google Play based on Tower of God, developed by Sunrise. The game drew in 120 million players shortly after its initial release. The Tower of God role-playing game's development continued for two years after its initial release, and the game saw a full commercial release in 2016. A cross-webtoon RPG game titled Hero Cantare was released in 2019, featuring Tower of God and other popular titles such as The God of High School and Hardcore Leveling Warrior.

A mobile turn-based role-playing game, titled Tower of God: Great Journey, developed by Korean company Ngelgames, was released in Korea in April 2022, and globally on February 14, 2023.

A collectible card role-playing game, titled Tower of God: New World, developed by Netmarble, was released globally on July 26, 2023. It features a story mode based on the series, as well as original storyline events and original characters.

The series has had collaborations with mobile games such as Fantasy War Tactics R, Heir of Light, and Seven Knights.

=== Merchandise ===
Naver sells a variety of Tower of God merchandise, such as figurines. During the commercial release of the Tower of God role-playing game, Naver released limited edition items worth ₩30,000 South Korean Won.

=== Anime ===
An anime television series adaptation was initially announced at Seoul Comic-Con in August 2019. The series, titled Kami no Tō -Tower of God- (神之塔 -Tower of God-), began releasing in April 2020 simultaneously in Japan, South Korea, and the United States. It is produced by Telecom Animation Film, with Aniplex subsidiary Rialto Entertainment responsible for Japanese production, and Sola Entertainment providing production management. The series aired on April 1, 2020, on South Korea's Naver Series On and television network Aniplus, and in Japan from April 2 to June 24, 2020, on Tokyo MX and other networks. (Note: The first two episodes received an early release on Naver Series On at 20:00 KST April 1 and 8, 2020. Subsequent Korean-dubbed episodes premiere at 23:00 KST, and subsequent Japanese-dubbed episodes aired at the listed air time of 24:30 JST, which is technically 00:30 JST of the following calendar day.) It is directed by Takashi Sano, with Hirokazu Hanai as assistant director, Erika Yoshida in series composition, Masashi Kudo and Miho Tanino in character designs, and Kevin Penkin composed the soundtrack. The opening theme song "Top", while the ending theme song is "Slump"; both performed by the K-pop band Stray Kids in Japanese, English, and Korean for the respective language dubs.

Crunchyroll streamed the series with original Japanese version and English subtitles as a co-production under its "Crunchyroll Originals" label. Viz Media licensed the series for home video distribution in North America and released it on Blu-ray on January 18, 2022.

In August 2022, during their industry panel at Crunchyroll Expo, Crunchyroll announced that a second season was in production. It is produced by The Answer Studio and directed by Akira Suzuki, with Kazuyoshi Takeuchi serving as chief director. The season aired for two consecutive cours from July 7 to December 29, 2024. For the first cours, covering the "Ōuji no Kikan" (王子の帰還; Return of the Prince) story arc, the opening theme song is "Rise Up", while the ending theme song is "Believe"; both performed by NiziU. For the second cours, covering the "Kōbō-sen" (工房戦; Workshop Battle) story arc, the opening theme song is "Night", while the ending theme song is "Falling Up"; both performed by Stray Kids.

== Reception ==
Head of Line Webtoon Tom Akel stated in July 2015 that the manhwa's weekly installments are read by five million people.
