= List of K-pop songs on the Billboard charts =

Current Billboard logo.

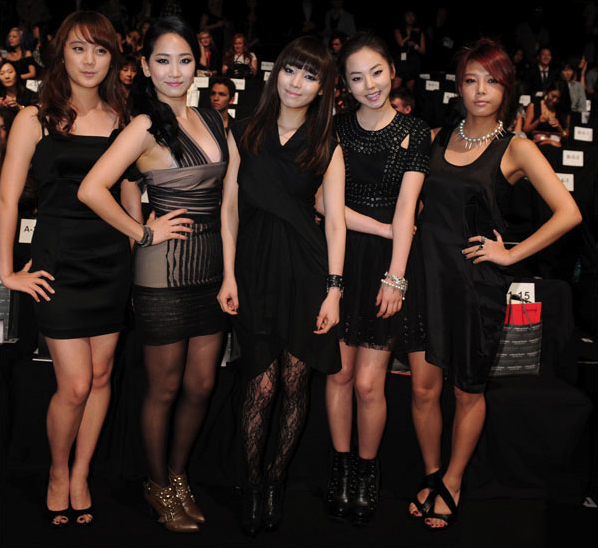
Wonder Girls was the first K-pop act to enter the Billboard Hot 100, doing so with "Nobody" in 2009.

This is a list of K-pop songs and singles, and songs performed by K-pop artists, on the Billboard charts.

== 2001 – present ==
- This list depends on continual updates taken from *Billboard artist/title/chart search and *Billboard charts.
- Charts with all updates 2009–present are marked (Complete).
- Billboard artists comprehensive update incomplete.
- Billboard charts comprehensive update incomplete.
- The list is currently minus portions of Psy's performance on 58 charts.
- The list is exclusive of Korea K-Pop Hot 100 data.
- Figures in red highlight indicate the highest ranking achieved by a K-pop artist on that chart.
- – Current week's charting

=== Adult Contemporary ===
- Chart started 1961-07-17

Chart date	Artist	Song/Album title	Peak position	Weeks on chart
2020-09-26	BTS	"Dynamite"	16	13 (R) 20
2021-06-12	BTS	"Butter"	25	1 (R) 10
2021-11-06	Coldplay & BTS	"My Universe"	16	20
2022-09-10	Charlie Puth feat. Jungkook	"Left and Right"	24	2 (R) 9
2023-08-19	Fifty Fifty	"Cupid"	20	13
2025-02-01	Rosé & Bruno Mars	"Apt."	16	23
2025-03-15	Lisa	"Moonlit Floor (Kiss Me)"	15	10 (R) 27
2025-05-24	Maroon 5 & Lisa	"Priceless"	16	3 (R) 13
2025-09-13	Alex Warren & Rosé	"On My Mind"	29	1
2025-10-11	Huntrix, Ejae, Audrey Nuna & Rei Ami	"Golden"	2	59
2026-04-04	BTS	"Swim"	16	19 (R) 26
2026-06-13	Tame Impala & Jennie	"Dracula" remix	13	24

=== Adult Pop Airplay (also called Adult Top 40 Airplay) ===
- Chart started 1996-03-16

Chart date	Artist	Song/Album title	Peak position	Weeks on chart
2020-09-12	BTS	"Dynamite"	10	20
2021-05-29	BTS	"Butter"	14	17
2021-10-09	Coldplay & BTS	"My Universe"	8	20
2022-01-08	Twice	"The Feels"	40	2
2023-06-03	Fifty Fifty	"Cupid"	9	20
2023-07-29	Jungkook feat. Latto	"Seven"	19	13
2023-11-11	The Kid Laroi, Jungkook & Central Cee	"Too Much"	22	18
2024-11-16	Rosé & Bruno Mars	"Apt."	2	32
2025-01-11	Twice	"Strategy"	37	6
2025-01-18	Lisa	"Moonlit Floor (Kiss Me)"	38	6
2025-03-15	Rosé	"Toxic Till the End"	38	3
2025-03-22	Lisa feat. Doja Cat & Raye	"Born Again"	38	3
2025-04-05	Jennie feat. Dua Lipa	"Handlebars"	40	1
2025-05-17	Maroon 5 & Lisa	"Priceless"	6	20
2025-07-12	Alex Warren & Rosé	"On My Mind"	14	13
2025-08-16	Huntrix, Ejae, Audrey Nuna & Rei Ami	"Golden"	1 (Note: Peaked at No. 1 on 2026-01-31 (1 week))	47
2025-11-15	Jisoo & Zayn Malik	"Eyes Closed"	25	16
2026-11-22	Tame Impala & Jennie	"Dracula" remix	1 (Total 16 weeks)	53
2026-04-04	BTS	"Swim"	14	14

=== Alternative Airplay ===
- Chart started 1988-09-10

Chart date	Artist	Song/Album title	Peak position	Weeks on chart
2021-10-02	Coldplay & BTS	"My Universe"	13	20

=== Billboard Global 200 (Complete) ===
- Chart started 2020-09-19
2020 – Present

Chart date	Artist	Song/Album title	Peak position	Weeks on chart
2020-09-19	BTS	"Dynamite"	1 (Total 4 weeks) (Note: 2020-10-03 (1 week), 2020-10-24 (2 weeks), 2021-01-16 (1 week))	113
2020-09-19	Jawsh 685, Jason Derulo & BTS	"Savage Love (Laxed – Siren Beat)" (BTS remix released 2020-10-02)	1 (Note: 2020-10-17 (1 week))	–
2020-09-19	Blackpink and Selena Gomez	"Ice Cream"	8	14
2020-09-19	Blackpink	"How You Like That"	24	29 (R) 34
2020-09-19	Pinkfong	"Baby Shark"	38	23 (R) 198
2020-09-19	Itzy	"Not Shy"	124	3
2020-09-19	BTS feat. Halsey	"Boy with Luv"	151	8 (R) 9
2020-10-03	Stray Kids	"Back Door"	169	1
2020-10-03	Treasure	"I Love You"	170	1
2020-10-17	Blackpink	"Lovesick Girls"	2	11 (R) 14
2020-10-17	Blackpink feat. Cardi B	"Bet You Wanna"	25	4
2020-10-17	Blackpink	"Pretty Savage"	32	5
2020-10-17	Blackpink	"Crazy Over You"	49	2
2020-10-17	Blackpink	"Love to Hate Me"	54	2
2020-10-17	Blackpink	"You Never Know"	64	1
2020-10-24	NCT	"Make A Wish (Birthday Song)"	128	2
2020-10-31	Blackpink	"Ddu-Du Ddu-Du"	158	2
2020-10-31	Blackpink	"Kill This Love"	181	1
2020-11-07	Twice	"I Can't Stop Me"	31	15
2020-11-14	K/DA: (G)I-dle, Madison Beer, Jaira Burns, & Lexie Liu as Seraphine	"More"	125	2
2020-11-28	Aespa	"Black Mamba"	138	2
2020-12-05	BTS	"Life Goes On"	1 (Note: Entered at No. 1 for 1 week)	20 (R) 22
2020-12-05	BTS	"Blue & Grey"	9	2
2020-12-05	BTS	"Stay"	16	1
2020-12-05	BTS	"Fly to My Room"	22	2
2020-12-05	BTS	"Telepathy"	28	2
2020-12-05	BTS	"Dis-ease"	30	1
2021-02-13	IU	"Celebrity"	78	2
2021-03-27	Rosé	"On the Ground"	1	7
2021-03-27	Rosé	"Gone"	29	2 (R) 3
2021-04-17	BTS	"Film Out"	5	5 (R) 7
2021-05-15	Itzy	"In the Morning"	34	5
2021-05-22	NCT Dream	"Hot Sauce"	96	2
2021-05-29	Aespa	"Next Level"	65	8
2021-06-05	BTS	"Butter"	1 (Total 2 weeks) (Note: Entered at No. 1 for 2 weeks)	73
2021-06-12	TXT feat. Seori	"0X1=Lovesong (I Know I Love You)"	167	2
2021-06-19	Exo	"Don't Fight the Feeling"	64	1
2021-06-19	Twice	"Alcohol-Free"	41	8
2021-07-03	Seventeen	"Ready To Love"	188	1
2021-07-24	BTS	"Permission to Dance"	1	43
2021-08-28	Red Velvet	"Queendom"	96	2
2021-09-04	Stray Kids	"Thunderous"	80	2
2021-09-04	TXT	"Loser=Lover"	184	1
2021-09-25	Lisa	"Lalisa"	2	10
2021-09-25	Lisa	"Money"	10	29
2021-10-02	NCT 127	"Sticker"	101	1
2021-10-09	Coldplay & BTS	"My Universe"	1	56 (R) 59
2021-10-09	Itzy	"Loco"	44	5
2021-10-16	Twice	"The Feels"	12	22
2021-10-16	Aespa	"Savage"	39	6
2021-11-06	DJ Snake, Ozuna, Megan Thee Stallion & Lisa	"SG"	19	5
2021-11-06	Seventeen	"Rock with You"	68	1
2021-11-06	NCT 127	"Favorite (Vampire)"	186	2
2021-11-13	Somi	"XOXO"	185	1
2021-11-20	Jin	"Yours"	90	1
2021-11-27	Twice	"Scientist"	52	3
2021-12-18	Ive	"Eleven"	68	14
2021-12-25	Juice Wrld & Suga	"Girl of My Dreams"	37	2
2022-01-08	V	"Christmas Tree"	51	1 (R) 2
2022-01-15	Got the Beat	"Step Back"	116	7
2022-01-15	Aespa	"Dreams Come True (Aespa version)"	197	1
2022-01-29	Kep1er	"Wa Da Da"	77	10
2022-02-26	Jungkook	"Stay Alive"	13	2
2022-03-05	Treasure	"Jikjin"	110	1
2022-03-19	Nmixx	"O.O"	138	5
2022-03-19	Treasure	"Darari"	169	1
2022-04-02	Stray Kids	"Maniac"	21	5
2022-04-02	(G)I-dle	"Tomboy"	58	7
2022-04-02	Red Velvet	"Feel My Rhythm"	36	5
2022-04-16	BigBang	"Still Life"	9	4
2022-04-16	Ive	"Love Dive"	15	24
2022-04-30	Seventeen	"Darl+ing"	78	1
2022-05-07	Ha Sung-woon & Jimin	"With You"	19	2
2022-05-07	Jessi	"Zoom"	93	4
2022-05-14	Psy feat. Suga	"That That"	5	10
2022-05-14	Le Sserafim	"Fearless"	69	8
2022-05-21	TXT	"Good Boy Gone Bad"	186	1
2022-06-11	Seventeen	"Hot"	91	2
2022-06-25	BTS	"Yet to Come"	2	6 (R) 7
2022-06-25	BTS	"Run BTS"	12	4 (R) 6
2022-06-25	BTS	"For Youth"	30	2
2022-06-25	BTS	"Born Singer"	36	1
2022-07-09	Charlie Puth feat. Jungkook	"Left and Right"	5	24 (R) 28
2022-07-09	Nayeon	"Pop!"	30	13
2022-07-09	Aespa	"Life's Too Short"	184	1
2022-07-16	J-Hope	"More"	15	3
2022-07-23	Aespa	"Girls"	42	3
2022-07-30	J-Hope	"Arson"	38	1
2022-07-30	Itzy	"Sneakers"	71	3
2022-08-13	Blackpink	"Ready for Love"	60	1 (R) 2
2022-08-20	Benny Blanco, BTS & Snoop Dogg	"Bad Decisions"	6	7
2022-08-20	Girls' Generation	"Forever 1"	67	1 (R) 3
2022-08-20	NewJeans	"Attention"	54	10 (R) 17
2022-08-20	NewJeans	"Hype Boy"	52	37 (R) 42
2022-09-03	Blackpink	"Pink Venom"	1 (Total 2 weeks)	26 (R) 30
2022-09-03	Ive	"After Like"	20	15 (R) 17
2022-09-10	Twice	"Talk That Talk"	18	10
2022-10-01	Blackpink	"Shut Down"	1	23 (R) 29
2022-10-01	Blackpink	"Typa Girl"	16	3
2022-10-01	Blackpink	"Hard to Love"	27	2
2022-10-01	Blackpink	"The Happiest Girl"	34	1
2022-10-01	Blackpink	"Yeah Yeah Yeah"	43	1
2022-10-01	Blackpink	"Tally"	52	1
2022-10-08	Crush feat. J-Hope	"Rush Hour"	102	1
2022-10-08	Nmixx	"Dice"	155	2
2022-10-22	Stray Kids	"Case 143"	59	2
2022-10-29	Le Sserafim	"Antifragile"	38	22
2022-11-05	(G)I-dle	"Nxde"	50	6
2022-11-12	Jin	"The Astronaut"	10	4
2022-12-03	Jungkook	"Dreamers"	9	9
2022-12-17	RM with Youjeen	"Wild Flower"	35	1
2022-12-17	RM with Anderson .Paak	"Still Life"	187	1
2022-12-31	NewJeans	"Ditto"	8	38 (R) 44
2022-12-31	NCT Dream	"Candy"	198	1
2023-01-14	NewJeans	"OMG"	10	40 (R) 43
2023-01-28	Taeyang feat. Jimin	"Vibe"	12	5
2023-02-04	Twice	"Moonlight Sunrise"	22	3 (R) 4
2023-02-11	TXT	"Sugar Rush Ride"	44	2
2023-03-18	J-Hope with J. Cole	"On the Street"	16	3
2023-03-25	Twice	"Set Me Free"	28	4
2023-03-25	Fifty Fifty	"Cupid"	2	46
2023-04-01	Jimin	"Set Me Free Pt. 2"	8	4
2023-04-08	Jimin	"Like Crazy"	2	56 (R) 61
2023-04-08	Jimin	"Face-Off"	133	1
2023-04-08	Jimin	"Alone"	189	1
2023-04-15	Jisoo	"Flower"	2	16
2023-04-15	Jisoo	"All Eyes on Me"	78	1
2023-04-15	Ive	"Kitsch"	59	7 (R) 8
2023-04-22	Agust D & IU	"People Pt. 2"	24	3
2023-04-22	Ive	"I Am"	21	22
2023-05-06	Agust D	"Haegeum"	15	2
2023-05-06	Seventeen	"Super"	37	11 (R) 12
2023-05-06	Agust D	"Amygdala"	161	1
2023-05-13	Le Sserafim feat. Nile Rodgers	"Unforgiven"	23	13 (R) 15
2023-05-13	Taeyang feat. Lisa	"Shoong!"	143	2
2023-05-20	Aespa	"Spicy"	70	9
2023-05-27	BTS	"The Planet"	62	1
2023-05-27	(G)I-dle	"Queencard"	21	17 (R) 18
2023-06-03	Kodak Black & NLE Choppa feat. Jimin, Jvke, Muni Long	"Angel Pt. 1"	16	9
2023-06-03	Enhypen	"Bite Me"	109	3
2023-06-10	Le Sserafim	"Eve, Psyche & the Bluebeard's Wife"	66	13
2023-06-17	Stray Kids	"S-Class"	24	5
2023-06-17	Halsey & Suga	"Lilith (Diablo IV Anthem)"	119	2
2023-06-24	BTS	"Take Two"	1	7
2023-07-01	NCT Dream	"Broken Melodies"	179	2
2023-07-08	Peggy Gou	"(It Goes Like) Nanana"	33	19 (R) 20
2023-07-15	Jungkook	"Still With You"	62	3
2023-07-15	Jungkook	"My You"	158	1
2023-07-22	NewJeans	"Super Shy"	2	31
2023-07-22	NewJeans	"New Jeans"	25	9
2023-07-22	TXT & Jonas Brothers	"Do It Like That"	88	1
2023-07-22	Exo	"Cream Soda"	86	3
2023-07-29	Jungkook feat. Latto	"Seven"	1 (Total 7 weeks) (Note: Entered at No. 1 for 7 weeks)	75 (R) 143
2023-07-29	Zerobaseone	"In Bloom"	182	1
2023-08-05	NewJeans	"ETA"	12	15 (R) 16
2023-08-05	NewJeans	"Cool with You"	22	5
2023-08-05	NewJeans	"ASAP"	33	3
2023-08-05	NewJeans	"Get Up"	57	2
2023-08-05	NCT Dream	"ISTJ"	125	1
2023-08-26	V	"Love Me Again"	12	9
2023-08-26	V	"Rainy Days"	16	6
2023-09-02	Somi	"Fast Forward"	145	4
2023-09-02	Aespa	"Better Things"	175	1
2023-09-02	Jihyo	"Killin' Me Good"	193	1
2023-09-09	Blackpink	"The Girls"	69	1
2023-09-16	AKMU	"Love Lee"	91	8
2023-09-23	V	"Slow Dancing"	4	10
2023-09-23	V	"Blue"	89	1
2023-09-23	V	"For Us"	113	1
2023-09-30	TXT & Anitta	"Back For More"	37	2 (R) 3
2023-09-30	Dynamic Duo & Lee Young-ji	"Smoke"	199	1
2023-10-14	Jungkook & Jack Harlow	"3D"	1	27
2023-10-14	Ive	"Either Way"	160	1 (R) 2
2023-10-21	Jennie	"You & Me"	7	10 (R) 12
2023-10-21	NewJeans	"Gods"	75	2 (R) 4
2023-10-21	NCT 127	"Fact Check"	89	2
2023-10-21	Ive	"Off The Record"	181	2
2023-10-28	TXT	"Chasing That Feeling"	72	2
2023-10-28	Ive	"Baddie"	66	6
2023-11-04	The Kid Laroi, Jungkook & Central Cee	"Too Much"	11	4
2023-11-04	Seventeen	"God of Music"	67	4
2023-11-04	The Weeknd, Jennie & Lily-Rose Depp	"One of the Girls"	10	134 (R) 157
2023-11-11	Le Sserafim	"Perfect Night"	18	25
2023-11-18	Jungkook	"Standing Next to You"	1	35 (R) 46
2023-11-18	Jungkook	"Yes or No"	23	4
2023-11-18	Jungkook	"Hate You"	31	2
2023-11-18	Jungkook & DJ Snake	"Please Don't Change"	46	2
2023-11-18	Jungkook	"Shot Glass of Tears"	51	1
2023-11-18	Jungkook & Major Lazer	"Closer to You"	52	1
2023-11-18	Jungkook	"Somebody"	57	1
2023-11-18	Jungkook	"Too Sad to Dance"	58	1
2023-11-25	Stray Kids	"Lalalala"	10	4
2023-11-25	Aespa	"Drama"	38	6 (R) 11
2023-11-25	Stray Kids	"Megaverse"	106	1
2023-12-02	Enhypen	"Sweet Venom"	104	1
2023-12-09	BabyMonster	"Batter Up"	101	4
2024-01-06	Jimin	"Closer Than This"	55	2
2024-01-13	Umi & V	"Wherever U R"	99	1
2024-02-03	IU	"Love Wins All"	25	7
2024-02-10	(G)I-dle	"Wife"	92	2
2024-02-17	Twice	"I Got You"	38	1
2024-02-17	(G)I-dle	"Super Lady"	114	3
2024-03-02	Le Sserafim	"Easy"	13	11
2024-03-02	Bibi	"Bam Yang Gang"	79	5
2024-03-02	TWS	"Plot Twist"	123	8
2024-03-09	Le Sserafim	"Smart"	39	12
2024-03-09	Twice	"One Spark"	93	3
2024-03-23	(G)I-dle	"Fate"	95	6
2024-03-30	V	"Fri(end)s"	5	6
2024-04-06	Illit	"Magnetic"	6	33 (R) 35
2024-04-13	J-Hope with Gaeko & Yoon Mi-rae	"Neuron"	84	1
2024-04-13	BabyMonster	"Sheesh"	33	14
2024-04-13	TXT	"Deja Vu"	39	4
2024-05-11	Zico feat. Jennie	"Spot!"	24	8
2024-05-11	Seventeen	"Maestro"	50	4
2024-05-11	Ive	"Heya"	56	7
2024-05-18	Crush	"Love You with All My Heart"	184	1
2024-05-25	RM	"Come Back to Me"	24	1
2024-05-25	Stray Kids feat. Charlie Puth	"Lose My Breath"	35	2
2024-05-25	Aespa	"Supernova"	17	24 (R) 25
2024-06-08	NewJeans	"How Sweet"	15	13
2024-06-08	NewJeans	"Bubble Gum"	30	7
2024-06-08	Aespa	"Armageddon"	28	13
2024-06-08	RM	"Lost"	68	1
2024-06-08	Eclipse	Sudden Shower"	167	3
2024-06-22	Jungkook	"Never Let Go"	20	2
2024-06-29	Nayeon	"ABCD"	54	3
2024-07-06	NewJeans	"Supernatural"	25	10
2024-07-06	Lee Young-ji feat. D.O.	"Small Girl"	38	4
2024-07-06	NewJeans	"Right Now"	81	1
2024-07-13	Lisa	"Rockstar"	4	10 (R) 11
2024-07-13	Jimin feat. Loco	"Smeraldo Garden Marching Band"	16	4
2024-07-20	Kiss of Life	"Sticky"	87	6
2024-07-20	BabyMonster	"Forever"	141	1
2024-07-27	Enhypen	"XO (Only If You Say Yes)"	84	1
2024-08-03	Jimin	"Who"	1 (Total 2 weeks)	71 (R) 74
2024-08-03	Stray Kids	"Chk Chk Boom"	10	8
2024-08-03	Jimin	"Be Mine"	89	1 (R) 2
2024-08-03	Jimin feat. Sofia Carson	"Slow Dance"	159	1
2024-08-03	Jimin	"Rebirth (Intro)"	187	1
2024-08-31	Lisa feat. Rosalía	"New Woman"	15	7
2024-09-14	Le Sserafim	"Crazy"	17	10 (R) 15
2024-09-21	Megan Thee Stallion & RM	"Neva Play"	17	4
2024-10-19	Lisa	"Moonlit Floor (Kiss Me)"	24	8
2024-10-26	Jennie	"Mantra"	3	10 (R) 15
2024-10-26	Karina	"Up"	27	5
2024-10-26	Jin	"Super Tuna"	159	1
2024-10-26	Seventeen feat. DJ Khaled	"Love, Money, Fame	50	3
2024-11-02	Rosé & Bruno Mars	"Apt."	1 (Total 12 weeks) (Note: Entered at No. 1 for 9 weeks, returned to No. 1 on 2025-01-11 (2 weeks), 2025-02-08 (1 week))	108
2024-11-02	Aespa	"Whiplash"	8	30 (R) 31
2024-11-09	Jin	"I'll Be There"	25	5
2024-11-09	Illit	"Cherish (My Love)"	110	2
2024-11-16	G-Dragon	"Power"	29	2 (R) 4
2024-11-16	Babymonster	"Drip"	30	6 (R) 16
2024-11-23	TXT	"Over the Moon"	195	1
2024-11-30	Jin	"Running Wild"	5	5 (R) 6
2024-11-30	Jin & Wendy	"Heart on the Window"	152	1
2024-11-30	Kiss of LIfe	"Igloo"	199	1
2024-12-07	Rosé	"Number One Girl"	29	9
2024-12-07	G-Dragon feat. Taeyang & Daesung	"Home Sweet Home"	27	12 (R) 14
2024-12-14	V & Park Hyo-shin	"Winter Ahead"	33	7
2024-12-21	Rosé	"Toxic Till the End"	15	18
2024-12-21	Twice	"Strategy"	39	6 (R) 28
2024-12-21	V & Bing Crosby	"White Christmas" (remix)	66	1
2024-12-21	Rosé	"Drinks or Coffee"	151	1
2024-12-21	Rosé	"3am"	165	1
2024-12-21	Rosé	"Gameboy"	177	1
2024-12-21	Rosé	"Two Years"	183	1
2024-12-21	Rosé	"Stay a Little Longer"	198	1
2025-01-25	BoyNextDoor	"If I Say, I Love You"	188	1
2025-02-01	Ive	"Rebel Heart"	97	6
2025-02-15	Jennie feat. Dominic Fike	"Love Hangover"	29	4 (R) 5
2025-02-22	Lisa feat. Doja Cat & Raye	"Born Again"	22	8
2025-02-22	Ive	"Attitude"	143	2
2025-02-22	Plave	"Dash"	195	1
2025-03-01	Jisoo	"Earthquake"	47	3
2025-03-08	Jennie feat. Doechii	"ExtraL"	18	11
2025-03-08	Don Toliver, J-Hope & Speedy, feat. Pharrell Williams	"LV Bag"	48	1
2025-03-08	G-Dragon & Anderson .Paak	"Too Bad"	30	5
2025-03-15	Lisa feat. Future	"Fxck Up the World"	25	2
2025-03-22	Jennie	"Like Jennie"	5	58
2025-03-22	J-Hope & Miguel	"Sweet Dreams"	16	5
2025-03-22	Jennie feat. Dua Lipa	"Handlebars"	21	5
2025-03-22	Jennie	"Zen"	122	1
2025-03-22	Jennie	"Start a War"	158	1
2025-03-22	Jennie, Childish Gambino & Kali Uchis	"Damn Right"	182	1
2025-03-29	Le Sserafim	"Hot"	45	6
2025-04-05	J-Hope	"Mona Lisa"	14	7
2025-05-17	Maroon 5 & Lisa	"Priceless"	40	2
2025-05-17	TXT	"Love Language"	163	1
2025-05-17	Tablo & RM	"Stop the Rain"	178	1
2025-05-24	Rosé	"Messy"	34	3 (R) 4
2025-05-31	Jin	"Don't Say You Love Me"	6	31 (R) 33
2025-06-07	Seventeen	"Thunder"	41	4
2025-06-21	Enhypen	"Bad Desire (With or Without You)"	68	1
2025-06-28	J-Hope & GloRilla	"Killin' It Girl"	3	15 (R) 16
2025-07-05	Huntrix, Ejae, Audrey Nuna & Rei Ami	"Golden"	1 (Total 18 weeks) (Note: Peaked at No. 1 on 2025-07-19 (1 week) and on 2025-08-02 (11 weeks), 2025-11-01 (2 weeks), 2025-11-15 (3 weeks), 2025-12-13 (1 week))	73
2025-07-05	Saja Boys, Andrew Choi, Neckwav, Danny Chung, Kevin Woo & samUIL Lee	"Your Idol"	3	33
2025-07-05	AllDay Project	"Famous"	43	9
2025-07-05	Huntrix, Ejae, Audrey Nuna & Rei Ami	"How It's Done"	5	33
2025-07-05	Saja Boys, Andrew Choi, Neckwav, Danny Chung, Kevin Woo & samUIL Lee	"Soda Pop"	3	42
2025-07-05	Illit	"Do the Dance"	144	2
2025-07-05	Huntrix, Ejae, Audrey Nuna & Rei Ami	"What It Sounds Like"	7	33
2025-07-05	Rumi, Jinu, Ejae, Andrew Choi & KPop Demon Hunters Cast	"Free"	11	25 (R) 27
2025-07-12	Aespa	"Dirty Work"	5	7
2025-07-12	Huntrix, Ejae, Audrey Nuna & Rei Ami	"Takedown"	11	24 (R) 26
2025-07-12	Alex Warren & Rosé	"On My Mind"	57	2
2025-07-12	Twice's Jeongyeon, Jihyo & Chaeyoung	"Takedown"	30	20
2025-07-26	Blackpink	"Jump"	1	29 (R) 34
2025-07-26	Twice	"This Is For"	38	4
2025-09-06	Stray Kids	"Ceremony"	10	4
2025-09-13	Ive	"XOXZ"	89	2
2025-09-20	Aespa	"Rich Man"	30	4
2025-09-27	Cortis	"Go!"	175	2
2025-10-11	Tame Impala & Jennie	"Dracula" remix	2	57
2025-10-25	Jisoo & Zayn Malik	"Eyes Closed"	20	4
2025-10-25	Babymonster	"We Go Up"	121	2
2025-11-01	Nmixx	"Blue Valentine"	59	4
2025-11-08	Le Sserafim & J-Hope	"Spaghetti"	6	15
2025-12-06	Stray Kids	"Do It"	13	3
2025-12-06	Hwasa	"Good Goodbye"	32	8
2025-12-06	AllDay Project	"One More Time"	111	1
2025-12-06	Stray Kids	"Divine"	126	1
2025-12-13	Illit	"Not Cute Anymore"	60	9
2025-12-20	Plave	"Bbuu!"	138	2 (R) 7
2026-01-31	Enhypen	"Knife"	90	1
2026-02-28	Ive	"Bang Bang"	61	4
2026-03-07	Hearts2Hearts	"Rude!"	57	9
2026-03-07	KiiiKiii	"404 (New Era)"	149	1
2026-03-14	Blackpink	"Go"	17	3
2026-03-14	Blackpink	"Champion"	76	1
2026-03-14	Blackpink	"Me and My"	119	1
2026-04-04	BTS	"Swim"	1 (Total 4 weeks) (Note: Entered at No. 1 for four weeks.)	34
2026-04-04	BTS	"Body to Body"	2	20
2026-04-04	BTS	"Hooligan"	3	20
2026-04-04	BTS	"Fya"	4	14
2026-04-04	BTS	"Normal"	4	13 (R) 28
2026-04-04	BTS	"Aliens"	6	13 (R) 14
2026-04-04	BTS	"Like Animals"	7	13
2026-04-04	BTS	"2.0"	8	20
2026-04-04	BTS	"Merry Go Round"	9	9 (R) 11
2026-04-04	BTS	"They Don't Know 'Bout Us"	11	13
2026-04-04	BTS	"One More Night"	15	8
2026-04-04	BTS	"Please"	17	8 (R) 9
2026-04-04	BTS	"Into the Sun"	19	9 (R) 11
2026-04-18	Plave feat. Sole	"Hmph!"	172	1
2026-04-25	Plave	"Born Savage"	172	1
2026-05-09	Cortis	"RedRed"	38	22
2026-05-16	Illit	"It's Me"	67	24
2026-06-06	Le Sserafim	"Boompala"	98	3
2026-06-13	Aespa	"Lemonade"	20	10
2026-06-13	I.O.I	"Suddenly"	136	2
2026-06-13	Aespa feat. G-Dragon	"WDA (Whole Different Animal)"	185	1
2026-06-27	BTS	"Come Over"	14	5
2026-06-27	Le Sserafim, Illit & Katseye	"Iconic by Mistake"	23	14
2026-08-01	Ateez	"Bad"	142	8
2026-08-08	Jennie	"Less Than a Lover"	26	3
2026-08-15	Hwang Young Woong	"If One Truly Loves"	186	1
2026-08-22	Stray Kids	"This & That"	25	2
2026-09-05	Enhypen	"Bloody Paradise"	32	3
2026-09-05	BigBang	"Biiig"	124	1
2026-09-12	Jennie	"Fallen Angel"	117	1
2026-09-19	Lisa	"Sawadika"	23	5 (R) 6
2026-10-03	Rosé	"New Trick"	179	1
2026-10-24	Plave	"Star Trace"	57	5
2026-10-24	Plave	"Ggun"	128	3
2026-10-24	Plave	"Sweet Rain"	130	3
2026-10-24	Plave	"The Answer is Yes"	160	2
2026-10-31	A2O Lite	"Neon"	8	4
2026-11-07	Lisa	"Tarantino"	97	1
2026-11-07	Illit	"You're Under Arrest"	22	3
2026-11-07	Ateez	"Drip"	190	1
2026-11-07	Ive	"Looks Can Kill"	194	1
2026-11-21	Rescene	"With"	58	1
2026-11-21	Bestie	"Love Options	145	1

=== Billboard Global Excl. U.S. (Complete) ===
- Chart started 2020-09-19
2020 – Present

Chart date	Artist	Song/Album title	Peak position	Weeks on chart
2020-09-19	BTS	"Dynamite"	1 (Total 8 weeks) (Note: 2020-09-26 (3 weeks), 2020-10-24 (2 weeks), 2020-12-26 (1 week), 2021-01-09 (2 weeks))	130 (R) 150
2020-09-19	Jawsh 685, Jason Derulo & BTS	"Savage Love (Laxed – Siren Beat)" (BTS remix released 2020-10-02)	3 (Note: Peaked at No. 3 on 2020-10-17 (2 weeks))	–
2020-09-19	Blackpink and Selena Gomez	"Ice Cream"	6	22
2020-09-19	Blackpink	"How You Like That"	14	40 (R) 56
2020-09-19	Pinkfong	"Baby Shark"	36	23 (R) 200
2020-09-19	Itzy	"Not Shy"	70	6
2020-09-19	Blackpink	"Kill This Love"	110	11
2020-09-19	BTS feat. Halsey	"Boy with Luv"	91	14 (R) 54
2020-09-19	Blackpink	"Ddu-Du Ddu-Du"	102	12 (R) 13
2020-09-19	BTS	"Stay Gold"	181	2
2020-09-26	Stray Kids	"Back Door"	108	3
2020-10-03	Treasure	"I Love You"	80	1
2020-10-03	Twice	"Feel Special"	190	1
2020-10-17	Blackpink	"Lovesick Girls"	1	25
2020-10-17	Blackpink feat. Cardi B	"Bet You Wanna"	17	4
2020-10-17	Blackpink	"Pretty Savage"	18	7
2020-10-17	Blackpink	"Crazy Over You"	30	3
2020-10-17	Blackpink	"Love to Hate Me"	33	3
2020-10-17	Blackpink	"You Never Know"	43	2
2020-10-24	NCT	"Make A Wish (Birthday Song)"	74	5
2020-10-24	BTS	"On"	195	2
2020-11-07	Twice	"I Can't Stop Me"	16	23
2020-11-14	K/DA: (G)I-dle, Madison Beer, Jaira Burns, & Lexie Liu as Seraphine	"More"	93	2
2020-11-21	Treasure	"MMM"	116	1
2020-11-28	Aespa	"Black Mamba"	81	3
2020-12-05	BTS	"Life Goes On"	1	25 (R) 36
2020-12-05	BTS	"Blue & Grey"	15	2
2020-12-05	BTS	"Fly to My Room"	20	2
2020-12-05	BTS	"Telepathy"	28	2
2020-12-05	BTS	"Stay"	32	2
2020-12-05	BTS	"Dis-ease"	35	2
2020-12-05	Got7	"Breath"	169	1
2020-12-05	NCT U	"90's Love"	173	1
2021-01-02	Twice	"Cry for Me"	122	1
2021-01-23	(G)I-dle	"Hwaa"	173	1
2021-02-06	IU	"Celebrity"	44	5 (R) 6
2021-02-13	Hyuna	"I'm Not Cool"	165	1
2021-03-06	Got7	"Encore"	108	1
2021-03-27	Rosé	"On the Ground"	1	9
2021-03-27	Rosé	"Gone"	17	6
2021-04-03	Brave Girls	"Rollin'"	189	1 (R) 4
2021-04-10	IU	"Lilac"	151	1
2021-04-10	BTS	"Film Out"	3	17
2021-05-08	Twice	"Kura Kura"	163	1
2021-05-08	Enhypen	"Drunk-Dazed"	145	2
2021-05-15	Itzy	"In the Morning"	22	8
2021-05-22	NCT Dream	"Hot Sauce"	51	3
2021-05-29	Aespa	"Next Level"	34	14
2021-06-05	BTS	"Butter"	1 (Total 5 weeks) (Note: Entered at No. 1 for 5 weeks)	76 (R) 79
2021-06-12	Stray Kids	"Wolfgang"	109	1
2021-06-12	TXT feat. Seori	"0X1=Lovesong (I Know I Love You)"	107	2
2021-06-19	Exo	"Don't Fight the Feeling"	33	2
2021-06-19	Twice	"Alcohol-Free"	22	10
2021-07-03	Seventeen	"Ready To Love"	93	1
2021-07-03	BTS feat. Desiigner	"MIC Drop" (Steve Aoki remix)	185	1
2021-07-10	NCT Dream	"Hello Future"	170	1
2021-07-17	Twice	"Perfect World"	192	1
2021-07-24	BTS	"Permission to Dance"	1	52
2021-07-24	Taeyeon	"Weekend"	181	1
2021-08-07	D.O.	"Rose"	198	1
2021-08-21	Somi	"Dumb Dumb	130	3
2021-08-28	Red Velvet	"Queendom"	63	4
2021-09-04	Stray Kids	"Thunderous"	52	5
2021-09-04	TXT	"Loser=Lover"	132	1
2021-09-25	Lisa	"Lalisa"	2	13
2021-09-25	Lisa	"Money"	7	34
2021-10-02	NCT 127	"Sticker"	53	1
2021-10-09	Coldplay & BTS	"My Universe"	1	64 (R) 82
2021-10-09	Itzy	"Loco"	29	8 (R) 9
2021-10-16	Twice	"The Feels"	10	32
2021-10-16	Aespa	"Savage"	24	11 (R) 15
2021-10-30	IU	"Strawberry Moon"	123	2
2021-11-06	DJ Snake, Ozuna, Megan Thee Stallion & Lisa	"SG"	13	6
2021-11-06	Seventeen	"Rock with You"	43	2
2021-11-06	NCT 127	"Favorite (Vampire)"	96	2
2021-11-13	Somi	"XOXO"	104	1
2021-11-20	Jin	"Yours"	67	1 (R) 2
2021-11-27	Twice	"Scientist"	26	5
2021-12-18	Ive	"Eleven"	38	20
2021-12-18	Stray Kids	"Christmas EveL"	197	1
2021-12-25	Juice Wrld & Suga	"Girl of My Dreams"	55	1
2021-12-25	NCT U	"Universe (Let's Play Ball)"	147	1
2022-01-01	Aespa	"Dreams Come True (Aespa version)"	119	7
2022-01-08	V	"Christmas Tree"	43	1 (R) 5
2022-01-15	Got the Beat	"Step Back"	69	2
2022-01-22	Enhypen	"Blessed-Cursed"	184	1
2022-01-29	Kep1er	"Wa Da Da"	39	16
2022-02-19	Mark Lee	"Child"	132	1
2022-02-26	Jungkook	"Stay Alive"	8	4
2022-02-26	Treasure	"Jikjin"	53	3 (R) 4
2022-03-05	Taeyeon	"INVU"	138	3
2022-03-12	Nmixx	"O.O"	71	9
2022-03-12	Treasure	"Darari"	91	5 (R) 8
2022-03-12	STAYC	"Run2U"	170	1
2022-03-26	(G)I-dle	"Tomboy"	34	17
2022-04-02	Stray Kids	"Maniac"	15	7
2022-04-02	Red Velvet	"Feel My Rhythm"	20	8
2022-04-02	Stray Kids	"Venom"	164	1
2022-04-09	NCT Dream	"Glitch Mode"	126	1
2022-04-16	BigBang	"Still Life"	3	5
2022-04-16	Ive	"Love Dive"	10	29
2022-04-30	Seventeen	"Darl+ing"	45	1
2022-05-07	Ha Sung-woon & Jimin	"With You"	14	3
2022-05-07	Jessi	"Zoom"	53	7
2022-05-14	Psy feat. Suga	"That That"	2	13
2022-05-14	Le Sserafim	"Fearless"	48	19 (R) 20
2022-05-21	TXT	"Good Boy Gone Bad"	125	2
2022-06-11	Seventeen	"Hot"	50	3
2022-06-11	NCT Dream	"Beatbox"	147	2
2022-06-25	BTS	"Yet to Come"	1	9 (R) 10
2022-06-25	BTS	"Run BTS"	8	5 (R) 10
2022-06-25	BTS	"For Youth"	21	2
2022-06-25	BTS	"Born Singer"	31	1
2022-07-09	Charlie Puth feat. Jungkook	"Left and Right"	2	34 (R) 43
2022-07-09	Nayeon	"Pop!"	15	15
2022-07-09	Aespa	"Life's Too Short"	92	3
2022-07-16	J-Hope	"More"	12	3
2022-07-23	Aespa	"Girls"	25	5
2022-07-23	Aespa	"Illusion"	150	1
2022-07-30	J-Hope	"Arson"	29	1
2022-07-30	Itzy	"Sneakers"	44	7
2022-08-06	Twice	"Celebrate"	154	2
2022-08-06	Seventeen	"World"	161	1
2022-08-13	Blackpink	"Ready for Love"	39	1 (R) 3
2022-08-13	NewJeans	"Attention"	34	16 (R) 29
2022-08-20	Benny Blanco, BTS & Snoop Dogg	"Bad Decisions"	7	8
2022-08-20	Girls' Generation	"Forever 1"	41	6
2022-08-20	NewJeans	"Hype Boy"	32	62 (R) 65
2022-08-27	NewJeans	"Cookie"	198	1
2022-09-03	Blackpink	"Pink Venom"	1 (Total 3 weeks) (Note: Entered at No. 1 for 3 weeks)	46
2022-09-03	Ive	"After Like"	9	25
2022-09-10	Twice	"Talk That Talk"	10	13
2022-10-01	Blackpink	"Shut Down"	1	28 (R) 42
2022-10-01	Blackpink	"Typa Girl"	13	5
2022-10-01	Blackpink	"Hard to Love"	19	2
2022-10-01	Blackpink	"The Happiest Girl"	22	2
2022-10-01	Blackpink	"Yeah Yeah Yeah"	27	2
2022-10-01	Blackpink	"Tally"	35	1
2022-10-01	NCT 127	"2 Baddies"	147	1
2022-10-08	Crush feat. J-Hope	"Rush Hour"	76	2
2022-10-08	Nmixx	"Dice"	99	4
2022-10-22	Stray Kids	"Case 143"	48	4
2022-10-22	Treasure	"Hello"	190	1
2022-10-29	Le Sserafim	"Antifragile"	23	31 (R) 34
2022-10-29	(G)I-dle	"Nxde"	34	9 (R) 13
2022-11-12	Jin	"The Astronaut"	6	5
2022-12-03	Jungkook	"Dreamers"	4	13 (R) 14
2022-12-17	RM with Youjeen	"Wild Flower"	20	2
2022-12-17	RM with Anderson .Paak	"Still Life"	165	1
2022-12-31	NewJeans	"Ditto"	4	61 (R) 63
2022-12-31	NCT Dream	"Candy"	97	1
2023-01-14	NewJeans	"OMG"	7	59 (R) 61
2023-01-28	Taeyang feat. Jimin	"Vibe"	9	8
2023-02-04	Twice	"Moonlight Sunrise"	18	5 (R) 7
2023-02-11	TXT	"Sugar Rush Ride"	30	2
2023-02-18	BSS feat. Lee Young-ji	"Fighting"	145	1
2023-03-18	J-Hope with J. Cole	"On the Street"	16	3
2023-03-25	Twice	"Set Me Free"	24	5
2023-03-25	Fifty Fifty	"Cupid"	1 (Total 2 weeks) (Note: Peaked at No. 1 on 2023-05-27 (1 week), 2023-06-03 (1 week))	47
2023-04-01	Jimin	"Set Me Free Pt. 2"	5	6
2023-04-08	Jimin	"Like Crazy"	2	60 (R) 68
2023-04-08	Jimin	"Face-Off"	109	1
2023-04-08	Jimin	"Alone"	145	1
2023-04-08	Ive	"Kitsch"	36	15
2023-04-15	Jisoo	"Flower"	2	22
2023-04-15	Jisoo	"All Eyes on Me"	42	1
2023-04-22	Agust D & IU	"People Pt. 2"	16	3
2023-04-22	Ive	"I Am"	11	33
2023-04-22	NewJeans	"Zero"	154	1
2023-05-06	Agust D	"Haegeum"	12	3
2023-05-06	Seventeen	"Super"	18	17
2023-05-06	Agust D	"Amygdala"	127	1
2023-05-06	Agust D feat. J-Hope	"Huh?!"	182	1
2023-05-06	Taeyang feat. Lisa	"Shoong!"	88	3
2023-05-06	Agust D feat. J-Hope	"D-Day"	200	1
2023-05-13	Le Sserafim feat. Nile Rodgers	"Unforgiven"	14	21
2023-05-20	Aespa	"Spicy"	40	16
2023-05-27	BTS	"The Planet"	37	1 (R) 2
2023-05-27	(G)I-dle	"Queencard"	12	24
2023-06-03	Kodak Black & NLE Choppa feat. Jimin, Jvke, Muni Long	"Angel Pt. 1"	12	10
2023-06-03	Enhypen	"Bite Me"	61	5
2023-06-10	Le Sserafim	"Eve, Psyche & the Bluebeard's Wife"	35	18
2023-06-17	Stray Kids	"S-Class"	15	8
2023-06-17	Halsey & Suga	"Lilith (Diablo IV Anthem)"	87	2
2023-06-17	Stray Kids feat. Tiger JK	"Topline"	186	1
2023-06-24	BTS	"Take Two"	1	8 (R) 9
2023-06-24	Lim Young-woong	"Grain of Sand"	102	7 (R) 11
2023-06-24	Exo	"Let Me In"	137	1 (R) 2
2023-07-01	Peggy Gou	"(It Goes Like) Nanana"	18	24 (R) 28
2023-07-01	NCT Dream	"Broken Melodies"	88	2 (R) 4
2023-07-08	The Weeknd, Jennie & Lily-Rose Depp	"One of the Girls"	5	1 (R) 162
2023-07-15	Jungkook	"Still With You"	33	4
2023-07-15	Jungkook	"My You"	78	1
2023-07-15	Exo	"Hear Me Out"	122	3
2023-07-22	NewJeans	"Super Shy"	2	36 (R) 41
2023-07-22	NewJeans	"New Jeans"	17	11
2023-07-22	TXT & Jonas Brothers	"Do It Like That"	71	1
2023-07-22	Exo	"Cream Soda"	44	4
2023-07-29	Jungkook feat. Latto	"Seven"	1 (Total 9 weeks) (Note: Entered at No. 1 for 9 weeks)	165
2023-07-29	Zerobaseone	"In Bloom"	103	2
2023-07-29	NCT Dream	"ISTJ"	63	4
2023-08-05	NewJeans	"ETA"	4	20 (R) 25
2023-08-05	NewJeans	"Cool with You"	19	6
2023-08-05	NewJeans	"ASAP"	26	4
2023-08-05	NewJeans	"Get Up"	44	2
2023-08-12	Treasure	"Bona Bona"	162	1
2023-08-26	V	"Love Me Again"	6	13 (R) 21
2023-08-26	V	"Rainy Days"	8	9
2023-08-26	Somi	"Fast Forward"	78	9
2023-09-02	Aespa	"Better Things"	104	1
2023-09-02	Jihyo	"Killin' Me Good"	127	1
2023-09-02	Isegye Idol	"Kidding"	167	1
2023-09-02	Itzy	"Cake"	194	1
2023-09-09	Blackpink	"The Girls"	42	2
2023-09-16	AKMU	"Love Lee"	40	12
2023-09-23	V	"Slow Dancing"	3	13 (R) 14
2023-09-23	V	"Blue"	59	2
2023-09-23	V	"For Us"	69	2
2023-09-23	Dynamic Duo & Lee Young-ji	"Smoke"	89	4
2023-09-30	TXT & Anitta	"Back For More"	29	2 (R) 3
2023-09-30	AKMU	"Fry's Dream"	134	4
2023-10-07	Ive	"Either Way"	86	5
2023-10-14	Jungkook & Jack Harlow	"3D"	1	32 (R) 33
2023-10-21	Jennie	"You & Me"	1	18
2023-10-21	NCT 127	"Fact Check"	39	3
2023-10-21	NewJeans	"Gods"	44	3 (R) 7
2023-10-21	Ive	"Off The Record"	99	3
2023-10-28	Ive	"Baddie"	34	9
2023-10-28	TXT	"Chasing That Feeling"	46	2
2023-10-28	Lim Young-woong	"Do or Die"	87	10 (R) 12
2023-11-04	The Kid Laroi, Jungkook & Central Cee	"Too Much"	10	4
2023-11-04	Seventeen	"God of Music"	32	5
2023-11-11	Sserafim	"Perfect Night"	8	28
2023-11-18	Jungkook	"Standing Next to You"	1 (Total 2 weeks)	55
2023-11-18	Jungkook	"Yes or No"	19	6
2023-11-18	Jungkook	"Hate You"	23	3
2023-11-18	Jungkook & DJ Snake	"Please Don't Change"	32	3
2023-11-18	Jungkook & Major Lazer	"Closer to You"	37	2
2023-11-18	Jungkook	"Too Sad to Dance"	38	2
2023-11-18	Jungkook	"Somebody"	40	2
2023-11-18	Jungkook	"Shot Glass of Tears"	41	2
2023-11-25	Stray Kids	"Lalalala"	6	5 (R) 6
2023-11-25	Aespa	"Drama"	21	27
2023-11-25	Stray Kids	"Megaverse"	70	1
2023-11-25	Stray Kids	"Blind Spot"	168	1
2023-11-25	Stray Kids	"Cover Me"	175	1
2023-11-25	Stray Kids	"Comflex"	190	1
2023-11-25	Stray Kids	"Leave"	196	1
2023-12-02	Enhypen	"Sweet Venom"	61	1
2023-12-02	Red Velvet	"Chill Kill"	193	1
2023-12-02	Dean	"Die 4 You"	194	1
2023-12-09	BabyMonster	"Batter Up"	49	8
2023-12-16	Taeyeon	"To. X"	103	1 (R) 11
2023-12-30	Exo	"The First Snow"	153	2
2024-01-06	Jimin	"Closer Than This"	35	3 (R) 4
2024-01-13	Umi & V	"Wherever U R"	64	1
2024-01-20	Riize	"Love 119"	127	1 (R) 2
2024-02-03	IU	"Love Wins All"	11	13
2024-02-03	Jaehyun	"Rhapsody Of Sadness"	178	1
2024-02-10	(G)I-dle	"Wife"	50	5
2024-02-10	(G)I-dle	"Super Lady"	61	6
2024-02-10	Nmixx	"Dash"	181	1
2024-02-17	Twice	"I Got You"	26	4
2024-02-17	TWS	"Plot Twist	62	13
2024-03-02	Le Sserafim	"Easy"	6	13
2024-03-02	Bibi	"Bam Yang Gang"	36	7
2024-03-09	Twice	"One Spark"	64	6
2024-03-09	Le Sserafim	"Smart"	20	15
2024-03-09	IU	"Holssi"	138	1
2024-03-09	IU	"Shopper"	179	1
2024-03-16	(G)I-dle	"Fate"	42	11
2024-03-30	V	"Fri(end)s"	3	9
2024-04-06	Illit	"Magnetic"	2	39 (R) 44
2024-04-13	BabyMonster	"Sheesh"	16	18
2024-04-13	J-Hope with Gaeko & Yoon Mi-rae	"Neuron"	38	1
2024-04-13	TXT	"Deja Vu"	20	5
2024-04-13	J-Hope with Jungkook	"I Wonder..."	132	1
2024-05-04	Riize	"Impossible"	135	1
2024-05-11	Zico feat. Jennie	"Spot!"	8	11
2024-05-11	Seventeen	"Maestro"	21	5
2024-05-11	Ive	"Heya"	22	10
2024-05-11	Crush	"Love You with All My Heart"	79	4
2024-05-11	NewJeans	"Bubble Gum"	18	11
2024-05-25	RM	"Come Back to Me"	16	3
2024-05-25	Stray Kids feat. Charlie Puth	"Lose My Breath"	22	2
2024-05-25	Aespa	"Supernova"	6	32 (R) 35
2024-05-25	Lim Young-woong	"Warmth"	161	1
2024-05-25	Eclipse	Sudden Shower"	69	9
2024-06-01	Ive	"Accendio"	129	1
2024-06-08	NewJeans	"How Sweet"	7	18
2024-06-08	Aespa	"Armageddon"	19	22
2024-06-08	RM	"Lost"	44	1
2024-06-15	BabyMonster	"Like That"	186	1
2024-06-22	Jungkook	"Never Let Go"	12	4
2024-06-29	Nayeon	"ABCD"	34	5
2024-07-06	NewJeans	"Supernatural"	14	14
2024-07-06	Lee Young-ji feat. D.O.	"Small Girl"	23	6
2024-07-06	NewJeans	"Right Now"	46	2
2024-07-06	Riize	"Boom Boom Bass"	87	2
2024-07-13	Lisa	"Rockstar"	1	13 (R) 15
2024-07-13	Jimin feat. Loco	"Smeraldo Garden Marching Band"	7	5
2024-07-13	BabyMonster	"Forever"	65	6
2024-07-13	Red Velvet	"Cosmic"	136	1
2024-07-13	Kiss of Life	"Sticky"	47	11
2024-07-27	Enhypen	"XO (Only If You Say Yes)"	53	2
2024-07-27	(G)I-dle	"Klaxon"	95	5
2024-08-03	Jimin	"Who"	1 (Total 2 weeks)	74 (R) 89
2024-08-03	Stray Kids	"Chk Chk Boom"	4	11
2024-08-03	Jimin	"Be Mine"	52	1 (R) 4
2024-08-03	Jimin feat. Sofia Carson	"Slow Dance"	96	1
2024-08-03	Jimin	"Rebirth (Intro)"	112	1
2024-08-03	Stray Kids	"Mountains"	160	1
2024-08-03	NCT 127	"Walk"	179	1
2024-08-03	Stray Kids	"I Like It"	180	1
2024-08-03	Jimin	"Interlude: Showtime"	200	1
2024-08-31	Lisa feat. Rosalía	"New Woman"	6	10
2024-09-14	Le Sserafim	"Crazy"	11	12 (R) 20
2024-09-21	Megan Thee Stallion & RM	"Neva Play"	13	4
2024-09-21	Meovv	"Meow"	120	2
2024-09-21	Day6	"Melt Down"	157	1
2024-10-05	Day6	"Happy"	144	4
2024-10-12	QWER	"My Name Is Malguem"	111	4
2024-10-19	Lisa	"Moonlit Floor (Kiss Me)"	14	9
2024-10-26	Jennie	"Mantra"	2	18 (R) 27
2024-10-26	Karina	"Up"	12	8
2024-10-26	Seventeen feat. DJ Khaled	"Love, Money, Fame	25	5
2024-10-26	Jin	"Super Tuna"	87	1
2024-11-02	Rosé & Bruno Mars	"Apt."	1 (Total 19 weeks) (Note: Entered at No. 1 for 9 weeks, returned to No. 1 on 2025-01-11 (8 weeks) and on 2025-03-29 (2 weeks); tied with Mariah Carey's "All I Want for Christmas Is You" as the longest-running #1 song for 14 weeks.)	108
2024-11-02	Aespa	"Whiplash"	5	49
2024-11-09	Jin	"I'll Be There"	10	6
2024-11-09	Illit	"Cherish (My Love)"	57	4
2024-11-16	G-Dragon	"Power"	14	7
2024-11-16	Babymonster	"Drip"	16	26
2024-11-16	Babymonster	"Clik Clak"	135	1
2024-11-16	Kiss of Life	"Igloo"	128	5 (R) 6
2024-11-23	TXT	"Over the Moon"	111	1
2024-11-23	Ive feat. David Guetta	"Supernova Love"	160	1
2024-11-30	Jin	"Running Wild"	4	12
2024-11-30	Jin & Wendy	"Heart on the Window"	99	1
2024-11-30	Jin	"Another Level"	142	1
2024-11-30	Jin	"Falling"	119	2
2024-11-30	Jin	"I Will Come to You"	172	1
2024-11-30	Enhypen	"No Doubt"	182	1
2024-12-07	G-Dragon feat. Taeyang & Daesung	"Home Sweet Home"	7	19 (R) 20
2024-12-07	Rosé	"Number One Girl"	11	14
2024-12-14	V & Park Hyo-shin	"Winter Ahead"	14	10
2024-12-21	Rosé	"Toxic Till the End"	6	21
2024-12-21	Twice	"Strategy"	35	8 (R) 28
2024-12-21	V & Bing Crosby	"White Christmas" (remix)	43	2
2024-12-21	Rosé	"Drinks or Coffee"	89	1
2024-12-21	Rosé	"3am"	98	1
2024-12-21	Rosé	"Gameboy"	106	1
2024-12-21	Rosé	"Two Years"	108	1
2024-12-21	Rosé	"Stay a Little Longer"	125	1
2024-12-28	Stray Kids	"Walkin on Water"	46	1
2025-01-18	BigBang	"Bang Bang Bang"	153	4
2025-01-25	BoyNextDoor	"If I Say, I Love You"	99	2 (R) 4
2025-01-25	BSS	"CBZ (Prime Time)"	171	1
2025-02-01	Ive	"Rebel Heart"	51	10
2025-02-15	Jennie feat. Dominic Fike	"Love Hangover"	16	8
2025-02-22	Lisa feat. Doja Cat & Raye	"Born Again"	12	11
2025-02-22	Ive	"Attitude"	75	5
2025-02-22	Plave	"Dash"	89	5
2025-02-22	Plave	"Rizz"	98	4 (R) 8
2025-02-22	Plave	"Chroma Drift"	115	5
2025-02-22	Plave	"Island"	128	4
2025-03-01	Jisoo	"Earthquake"	22	4
2025-03-08	Jennie feat. Doechii	"ExtraL"	13	12
2025-03-08	Don Toliver, J-Hope & Speedy, feat. Pharrell Williams	"LV Bag"	43	2
2025-03-08	G-Dragon & Anderson .Paak	"Too Bad"	12	7
2025-03-15	Lisa feat. Future	"Fxck Up the World"	14	3
2025-03-15	Hearts2Hearts	"The Chase"	102	3
2025-03-15	G-Dragon	"Take Me"	153	1
2025-03-15	Lisa feat. Megan Thee Stallion	"Rapunzel"	165	1
2025-03-22	Jennie	"Like Jennie"	3	67
2025-03-22	J-Hope & Miguel	"Sweet Dreams"	12	7
2025-03-22	Jennie feat. Dua Lipa	"Handlebars"	15	7
2025-03-22	Jennie	"Zen"	75	1
2025-03-22	Jennie	"Start a War"	105	1
2025-03-22	Jennie	"With the IE (Way Up)"	144	1
2025-03-22	Jennie, Childish Gambino & Kali Uchis	"Damn Right"	148	1
2025-03-29	Le Sserafim	"Hot"	21	8
2025-04-05	J-Hope	"Mona Lisa"	9	8 (R) 9
2025-05-03	Lim Young-woong	"Heavenly Ever After"	169	1
2025-05-17	Maroon 5 feat. Lisa	"Priceless"	23	2
2025-05-17	TXT	"Love Language"	99	1
2025-05-17	Tablo & RM	"Stop the Rain"	116	1
2025-05-17	Meovv	"Meovv"	105	5
2025-05-24	Rosé	"Messy"	25	3 (R) 6
2025-05-31	Jin	"Don't Say You Love Me"	4	44
2025-05-31	BoyNextDoor	"I Feel Good"	181	1
2025-05-31	Jin	"Nothing Without Your Love"	194	1
2025-05-31	10cm	"To Reach You"	200	1
2025-06-07	Seventeen	"Thunder"	14	5
2025-06-14	IU	"Never Ending Story"	104	1
2025-06-21	Enhypen	"Bad Desire (With or Without You)"	40	2
2025-06-28	J-Hope & GloRilla	"Killin' It Girl"	2	21
2025-07-05	ALLDAY PROJECT	"Famous"	19	11
2025-07-05	Huntrix, Ejae, Audrey Nuna & Rei Ami	"Golden"	1 (Total 20 weeks) (Note: Peaked at No. 1 on 2025-07-19 (1 week) and on 2025-08-02 (11 weeks), 2025-11-01 (2 weeks), 2025-11-15 (3 weeks), 2025-12-13 (3 weeks))	73
2025-07-05	Illit	"Do the Dance"	72	4
2025-07-05	Saja Boys, Andrew Choi, Neckwav, Danny Chung, Kevin Woo & samUIL Lee	"Your Idol"	5	30
2025-07-05	Huntrix, Ejae, Audrey Nuna & Rei Ami	"How It's Done"	7	30
2025-07-05	Saja Boys, Andrew Choi, Neckwav, Danny Chung, Kevin Woo & samUIL Lee	"Soda Pop"	3	40 (R) 41
2025-07-05	Hearts2Hearts	"Style"	130	3
2025-07-05	Rumi, Jinu, Ejae, Andrew Choi & KPop Demon Hunters Cast	"Free"	15	24
2025-07-05	Huntrix, Ejae, Audrey Nuna & Rei Ami	"What It Sounds Like"	13	31
2025-07-12	Aespa	"Dirty Work"	2	11
2025-07-12	Huntrix, Ejae, Audrey Nuna & Rei Ami	"Takedown"	16	22
2025-07-12	Alex Warren & Rosé	"On My Mind"	79	2
2025-07-12	Twice's Jeongyeon, Jihyo & Chaeyoung	"Takedown"	43	18
2025-07-12	ALLDAY PROJECT	"Wicked"	108	2
2025-07-26	Blackpink	"Jump"	1	44
2025-07-26	Twice	"This Is For"	21	5
2025-08-30	Lisa	"Dream"	122	1
2025-09-06	Stray Kids	"Ceremony"	8	4
2025-09-06	Ive	"XOXZ"	42	5
2025-09-06	Stray Kids	"Bleep"	186	1
2025-09-13	Lim Young-woong	"Eternal Moment"	175	3
2025-09-20	Aespa	"Rich Man"	15	6
2025-09-27	Cortis	"Go!"	129	3
2025-09-27	Cortis	"FaSHioN"	198	1
2025-10-04	Plave	"Hide and Seek"	197	1
2025-10-11	Huntrix, Felicity Kyle Napuli, Venisse Siy, Maronne Cruz & KPop Demon Hunters Cast	"Golden" (Tagalog version)	104	1
2025-10-11	Tame Impala & Jennie	"Dracula" remix	2	51
2025-10-25	Jisoo & Zayn Malik	"Eyes Closed"	10	4
2025-10-25	Babymonster	"We Go Up"	67	2
2025-11-01	Nmixx	"Blue Valentine"	26	7
2025-11-08	Le Sserafim & J-Hope	"Spaghetti"	3	20
2025-11-29	AllDayProject	"One More Time"	47	4
2025-12-06	Stray Kids	"Do It"	8	3
2025-12-06	Hwasa	"Good Goodbye"	15	8
2025-12-06	Stray Kids	"Divine"	101	1
2025-12-13	Illit	"Not Cute Anymore"	45	10
2025-12-20	Plave	"Bbuu!"	60	18
2026-01-31	Enhypen	"Knife"	62	2
2026-02-07	Lngshot	"Moonwalkin'"	180	1
2026-02-21	KiiiKiii	"404 (New Era)"	59	8
2026-02-28	Ive	"Bang Bang"	33	8
2026-03-07	Hearts2Hearts	"Rude!"	36	15
2026-03-07	Park Ji Hyeon	"M/V"	84	1
2026-03-14	Blackpink	"Go"	13	4
2026-03-14	Blackpink	"Champion"	44	1
2026-03-14	Blackpink	"Me and My"	65	1
2026-03-14	Blackpink	"Fxxxboy"	116	1
2026-03-14	Ive	"Blackhole"	130	1
2026-04-04	BTS	"Swim"	1 (Total 8 weeks) (Note: Entered at No. 1 for 4 weeks, re-entered on 2026-05-16 (4 weeks))	34
2026-04-04	BTS	"Body to Body"	2	25
2026-04-04	BTS	"Hooligan"	3	23
2026-04-04	BTS	"Fya"	4	18
2026-04-04	BTS	"Normal"	2	34
2026-04-04	BTS	"Aliens"	6	16 (R) 18
2026-04-04	BTS	"Like Animals"	7	17
2026-04-04	BTS	"2.0"	5	23
2026-04-04	BTS	"Merry Go Round"	9	15
2026-04-04	BTS	"They Don't Know 'Bout Us"	10	17
2026-04-04	BTS	"One More Night"	11	14
2026-04-04	BTS	"Please"	12	14
2026-04-04	BTS	"Into the Sun"	13	14
2026-04-18	Plave feat. Sole	"Hmph!"	62	6
2026-04-18	Plave	"Borrow Your Night"	187	1 (R) 3
2026-04-25	Plave	"Born Savage"	62	5
2026-04-25	Plave	"Think I Am"	89	5
2026-04-25	Plave	"Blossom Parade"	103	1
2026-04-25	Plave	"Lunar Hearts"	115	1
2026-04-25	AKMU	"Joy, Sorrow, a Beautiful Heart"	126	2
2026-04-25	TXT	"Stick With You"	159	2
2026-05-02	AKMU	"Paradise of Rumors"	169	1
2026-05-09	Cortis	"RedRed"	19	27
2026-05-09	NCT Wish	"Ode to Love"	138	1
2026-05-09	Le Sserafim	"Celebration"	170	1
2026-05-16	Illit	"It's Me"	32	28
2026-05-23	Babymonster	"Choom"	110	2
2026-05-30	Aespa feat. G-Dragon	"WDA (Whole Different Animal)"	101	1
2026-05-30	Park Seo-jin	"The One I Fell For At First Sight"	110	1
2026-05-30	Nmixx	"Heavy Serenade"	138	2
2026-06-06	Le Sserafim	"Boompala"	63	4
2026-06-06	I.O.I	"Suddenly"	55	5
2026-06-13	Aespa	"Lemonade"	8	16
2026-06-27	BTS	"Come Over"	5	7
2026-06-27	Le Sserafim, Illit & Katseye	"Iconic by Mistake"	22	14
2026-07-04	Isegye Idol	"Smile for You"	86	1
2026-07-11	Stray Kids	"Run It"	163	1
2026-07-11	Hearts2Hearts	"Lemon Tang"	181	1
2026-07-18	Ateez	"Bad"	70	17 (R) 18
2026-07-25	Hwang Young Woong	"If One Truly Loves"	44	2 (R) 3
2026-07-25	Park Ji-hyeon	"Sad Monologue"	51	1
2026-07-25	Yeonjun	"Ice Cream"	89	1
2026-07-25	Rescene	"Love Attack"	167	1
2026-08-08	Jennie	"Less Than a Lover"	11	4 (R) 5
2026-08-22	Stray Kids	"This & That"	15	3
2026-08-29	BigBang	"Biiig"	49	3
2026-09-05	Enhypen	"Bloody Paradise"	12	4
2026-09-12	Jennie	"Fallen Angel"	57	2
2026-09-12	Jennie	"Heaven"	182	1
2026-09-19	Lisa	"Sawadika"	13	6 (R) 7
2026-09-19	Jisoo	"Click"	96	1
2026-09-26	Winter	"Saddle Up"	108	1
2026-09-26	Karina	"16 Bit"	149	1
2026-09-26	Lim Young-woong	"Love Always Runs Away"	150	1
2026-09-26	Lim Young-woong	"Love Always Run Away"	150	2 (R) 5
2026-09-26	IU	"Dear My Crazy Soulmate"	187	1
2026-10-03	Rosé	"New Trick"	118	1
2026-10-03	Soyeon feat. Kian84	"I'm Gonna Toesa"	149	1
2026-10-24	Plave	"Star Trace"	18	5
2026-10-24	Plave	"Ggun"	38	5
2026-10-24	Plave	"Sweet Rain"	43	5
2026-10-24	Plave	"The Answer is Yes"	49	5
2026-10-24	Plave	"Rewind"	60	5
2026-10-24	A20 Lite	"Neon"	3	5
2026-10-31	K/DA with Mimi Webb, Sophie Powers, Miyeon & Soyeon	"Firestarter"	68	3
2026-10-31	NCT Wish	"I Spy"	158	1
2026-11-07	Lisa	"Tarantino"	78	1
2026-11-07	Ive	"Looks Can Kill"	82	3
2026-11-07	Illit	"You're Under Arrest"	11	3
2026-11-07	Ateez	"Drip"	142	1
2026-11-14	Rescene	"With"	22	2
2026-11-14	Bestie"	"Love Options"	62	2
2026-11-21	Rescene	"Inside Out"	121	1

=== Billboard Hot 100 (Complete) ===
- Chart started 1958-08-04

Chart date	Artist	Song/Album title	Peak position	Weeks on chart
2009-10-31	Wonder Girls	"Nobody"	76	1
2010	JYJ	The beginning		
2012-09-22	Psy	"Gangnam Style"	2	31
2012	Junsu ( JYJ)	Tarantallegra		
2013-04-27	Psy	"Gentleman"	5	15
2014-06-28	Psy feat. Snoop Dogg	"Hangover"	26	1
2014-08-16	JYJ	Just Us	43	1
2015-12-19	Psy feat. CL	"Daddy"	97	1
2016-10-22	CL	"Lifted"	94	1
2017-10-07	BTS	"DNA"	67	4
2017-12-16	BTS feat. Desiigner	"MIC Drop" (Steve Aoki remix)	28	10
2018-06-02	BTS	"Fake Love"	10	6
2018-06-30	Blackpink	"Ddu-Du Ddu-Du"	55	1
2018-09-08	BTS feat. Nicki Minaj	"Idol"	11	3
2018-11-03	Dua Lipa & Blackpink	"Kiss and Make Up"	93	1
2018-11-10	Steve Aoki feat. BTS	"Waste It on Me"	89	1
2019-01-12	Pinkfong	"Baby Shark"	32	20
2019-04-20	Blackpink	"Kill This Love"	41	4
2019-04-27	BTS feat. Halsey	"Boy with Luv"	8	8
2019-04-27	BTS	"Make It Right"	76	2
2019-10-12	J-Hope feat. Becky G	"Chicken Noodle Soup"	81	1
2020-02-01	BTS	"Black Swan"	57	1
2020-03-07	BTS	"On"	4	2
2020-03-07	BTS	"My Time" (Jungkook solo)	84	1
2020-03-07	BTS	"Filter" (Jimin solo)	87	1
2020-06-06	Suga (Agust D)	"Daechwita"	76	1
2020-06-13	Lady Gaga and Blackpink	"Sour Candy"	33	2
2020-06-27	Jawsh 685, Jason Derulo & BTS	"Savage Love (Laxed – Siren Beat)"	1 (Note: 2020-10-17 (1 week))	31
2020-07-11	Blackpink	"How You Like That"	33	2
2020-09-05	BTS	"Dynamite"	1 (Total 3 weeks) (Note: Debuted at No. 1 (2 weeks), returned to No. 1 on 2020-10-03 (1 week))	32
2020-09-12	Blackpink and Selena Gomez	"Ice Cream"	13	8
2020-10-17	Blackpink	"Lovesick Girls"	59	1
2020-12-05	BTS	"Life Goes On"	1 (Note: Debuted at No. 1 (1 week))	3
2020-12-05	BTS	"Blue & Grey"	13	1
2020-12-05	BTS	"Stay"	22	1
2020-12-05	BTS	"Fly to My Room"	69	1
2020-12-05	BTS	"Telepathy"	70	1
2020-12-05	BTS	"Dis-ease"	72	1
2021-03-27	Rosé	"On the Ground"	70	1
2021-04-17	BTS	"Film Out"	81	1
2021-06-05	BTS	"Butter"	1 (Total 10 weeks) (Note: Debuted at No. 1 (7 weeks), returned to No. 1 on 2021-07-31 (2 weeks), 2021-09-11 (1 week, remix with Megan Thee Stallion not credited for rebound))	20
2021-07-24	BTS	"Permission to Dance"	1	7
2021-09-25	Lisa	"Lalisa"	84	1
2021-10-09	Coldplay & BTS	"My Universe"	1	17
2021-10-16	Twice	"The Feels"	83	1
2021-11-06	Lisa	"Money"	90	2
2021-12-25	Juice Wrld & Suga	"Girl of My Dreams"	29	1
2022-01-08	V	"Christmas Tree"	79	1
2022-02-26	Jungkook	"Stay Alive"	95	1
2022-05-14	Psy feat. Suga	"That That"	80	1
2022-06-25	BTS	"Yet to Come"	13	2
2022-06-25	BTS	"Run BTS"	73	1
2022-07-09	Charlie Puth feat. Jungkook	"Left and Right"	22	17
2022-07-16	J-Hope	"More"	82	1
2022-07-30	J-Hope	"Arson"	96	1
2022-08-20	Benny Blanco, BTS & Snoop Dogg	"Bad Decisions"	10	5
2022-09-03	Blackpink	"Pink Venom"	22	6
2022-10-01	Blackpink	"Shut Down"	25	3
2022-11-12	Jin	"The Astronaut"	51	1
2022-12-17	RM with Youjeen	"Wild Flower"	83	1
2023-01-21	NewJeans	"Ditto"	85	5
2023-01-28	Taeyang feat. Jimin	"Vibe"	76	1
2023-01-28	NewJeans	"OMG"	74	6
2023-02-04	Twice	"Moonlight Sunrise"	84	1
2023-03-18	J-Hope with J. Cole	"On the Street"	60	1
2023-04-01	Jimin	"Set Me Free Pt. 2"	30	1
2023-04-01	Fifty Fifty	"Cupid"	17	25
2023-04-08	Jimin	"Like Crazy"	1 (Note: Debuted at No. 1 (1 week))	5
2023-05-06	Agust D	"Haegeum"	58	1
2023-06-03	Kodak Black & NLE Choppa feat. Jimin, Jvke, Muni Long	"Angel Pt. 1"	65	2 (Note: Re-entered on its second week)
2023-06-24	BTS	"Take Two"	48	1
2023-07-22	NewJeans	"Super Shy"	48	8
2023-07-29	Jungkook feat. Latto	"Seven"	1	15 (Note: Re-entered on its 14th week)
2023-08-05	NewJeans	"ETA"	81	1
2023-08-05	NewJeans	"Cool with You"	93	1
2023-08-26	V	"Love Me Again"	96	1
2023-09-23	V	"Slow Dancing"	51	1
2023-10-14	Jungkook & Jack Harlow	"3D"	5	9 (Note: Re-entered on its eighth week)
2023-11-04	The Kid Laroi, Jungkook & Central Cee	"Too Much"	44	6
2023-11-18	Jungkook	"Standing Next to You"	5	19
2023-11-25	Stray Kids	"Lalalala"	90	1
2023-12-30	The Weeknd, Jennie & Lily-Rose Depp	"One of the Girls"	51	20
2024-03-09	Le Sserafim	"Easy"	99	1
2024-03-30	V	"Fri(end)s"	65	1
2024-04-20	Illit	"Magnetic"	91	1
2024-05-25	Stray Kids feat. Charlie Puth	"Lose My Breath"	90	1
2024-06-22	Jungkook	"Never Let Go"	97	1
2024-07-13	Lisa	"Rockstar"	70	1
2024-07-13	Jimin feat. Loco	"Smeraldo Garden Marching Band"	88	1
2024-08-03	Jimin	"Who"	12	33 (Note: Re-entered on its 23rd week)
2024-08-03	Stray Kids	"Chk Chk Boom"	49	1
2024-08-31	Lisa feat. Rosalía	"New Woman"	97	1
2024-09-14	Le Sserafim	"Crazy"	76	2
2024-09-21	Megan Thee Stallion & RM	"Neva Play"	36	2
2024-10-26	Jennie	"Mantra"	98	2
2024-11-02	Rosé & Bruno Mars	"Apt."	3	45
2024-11-30	Jin	"Running Wild"	53	1
2024-12-14	V & Park Hyo-shin	"Winter Ahead"	99	1
2024-12-21	Rosé	"Toxic Till the End"	90	1
2024-12-21	V & Bing Crosby	"White Christmas" (remix)	93	1
2025-02-15	Jennie feat. Dominic Fike	"Love Hangover"	96	1
2025-02-22	Lisa feat. Doja Cat & Raye	"Born Again"	68	2
2025-03-08	Jennie feat. Doechii	"ExtraL"	75	2
2025-03-08	Don Toliver, J-Hope & Speedy, feat. Pharrell Williams	"LV Bag"	83	1
2025-03-22	J-Hope & Miguel	"Sweet Dreams"	66	1
2025-03-22	Jennie feat. Dua Lipa	"Handlebars"	80	1
2025-03-22	Jennie	"Like Jennie"	83	3
2025-04-05	J-Hope	"Mona Lisa"	65	1
2025-05-17	Maroon 5 & Lisa	"Priceless"	76	1
2025-05-31	Jin	"Don't Say You Love Me"	90	1
2025-06-28	J-Hope & GloRilla	"Killin' It Girl"	40	2
2025-06-28	Ateez	"Lemon Drop"	69	1
2025-07-05	Saja Boys, Andrew Choi, Neckwav, Danny Chung, Kevin Woo & samUIL Lee	"Your Idol"	4	23 (R) 25
2025-07-05	Huntrix, Ejae, Audrey Nuna & Rei Ami	"Golden"	1 (Total 8 weeks) (Note: Peaked at No. 1 on 2025-08-16 (1 week), 2025-08-30 (7 weeks))	47
2025-07-12	Huntrix, Ejae, Audrey Nuna & Rei Ami	"How It's Done"	8	22 (R) 32
2025-07-12	Saja Boys, Andrew Choi, Neckwav, Danny Chung, Kevin Woo & samUIL Lee	"Soda Pop"	3	22 (R) 25
2025-07-12	Huntrix, Ejae, Audrey Nuna & Rei Ami	"What It Sounds Like"	15	21
2025-07-12	Rumi, Jinu, Ejae, Andrew Choi & KPop Demon Hunters Cast	"Free"	23	20
2025-07-12	Alex Warren & Rosé	"On My Mind"	60	2
2025-07-12	Huntrix, Ejae, Audrey Nuna & Rei Ami	"Takedown"	21	20
2025-07-19	Twice's Jeongyeon, Jihyo & Chaeyoung	"Takedown"	50	19
2025-07-26	Blackpink	"Jump"	28	10
2025-07-26	Ateez	"In Your Fantasy"	68	1
2025-08-02	Twice	"Strategy"	51	17
2025-09-06	Stray Kids	"Ceremony"	52	1
2025-10-11	Tame Impala & Jennie	"Dracula" remix	3	59
2025-10-25	Jisoo & Zayn Malik	"Eyes Closed"	72	1
2025-11-08	Le Sserafim & J-Hope	"Spaghetti"	50	2
2025-12-06	Stray Kids	"Do It"	68	1
2026-03-14	Blackpink	"Go"	63	1
2026-04-04	BTS	"Swim"	1	20
2026-04-04	BTS	"Body to Body"	25	5
2026-04-04	BTS	"Hooligan"	35	4
2026-04-04	BTS	"Fya"	36	3
2026-04-04	BTS	"Normal"	33	3 (R) 5
2026-04-04	BTS	"Aliens"	47	2
2026-04-04	BTS	"2.0"	50	4
2026-04-04	BTS	"Merry Go Round"	52	2
2026-04-04	BTS	"Like Animals"	53	2
2026-04-04	BTS	"They Don't Know 'Bout Us"	56	2
2026-04-04	BTS	"One More Night"	61	1
2026-04-04	BTS	"Please"	63	1
2026-04-04	BTS	"Into the Sun"	68	1
2026-06-27	Le Sserafim, Illit & Katseye	"Iconic by Mistake"	38	8 (R) 9
2026-06-27	BTS	"Come Over"	69	1
2026-08-22	Stray Kids	"This & That"	38	1
2026-09-19	Lisa	"Sawadika"	69	2

=== Bubbling Under Hot 100 Singles (Complete) ===
- Chart started 1992-12-05 (Chart is missing results for week 2009-11-14)

Chart date	Artist	Song/Album title	Peak position	Weeks on chart
2012-09-08	Psy	"Gangnam Style"	1 (Note: 2012-09-15 (1 week))	2
2017-03-04	BTS	"Spring Day"	15	1
2017-07-15	Blackpink	"As If It's Your Last"	13	1
2018-01-03	Fall Out Boy feat. RM	"Champion Remix"	18	1
2018-09-08	BTS	"Euphoria" (Jungkook solo)	5	1
2018-09-08	BTS	"I'm Fine"	7	1
2018-09-08	BTS	"Trivia: Seesaw" (Suga solo)	22	1
2019-04-27	BTS	"Home"	1	1
2019-04-27	BTS	"Mikrokosmos"	2	1
2019-04-27	BTS	"Dionysus"	11	1
2019-04-27	BTS	"Jamais Vu"	14	1
2019-06-22	BTS and Charli XCX	"Dream Glow"	6	1
2019-07-06	BTS and Juice Wrld	"All Night"	18	1
2019-07-13	BTS	"Heartbeat"	7	1
2019-10-19	SuperM	"Jopping"	25	1
2020-03-07	BTS	"Louder Than Bombs"	6	1
2020-03-07	BTS	"Ugh!" (RM, J-Hope, Suga)	7	1
2020-03-07	BTS	"Friends" (V, Jimin)	16	1
2020-03-07	BTS	"We Are Bulletproof: The Eternal"	20	1
2020-03-07	BTS	"00:00 (Zero O'Clock)" (Jin, V, Jimin, Jungkook)	21	1
2020-03-07	BTS	"Inner Child" (V solo)	23	1
2020-07-04	BTS	"Stay Gold"	9	1
2020-10-17	Blackpink feat. Cardi B	"Bet You Wanna"	1	1
2020-10-17	Blackpink	"Pretty Savage"	21	1
2021-10-23	Lisa	"Money"	6	2
2021-11-06	DJ Snake, Ozuna, Megan Thee Stallion & Lisa	"SG"	2	1
2021-11-20	Jin	"Yours"	12	1
2022-04-02	Stray Kids	"Maniac"	19	1
2022-06-25	BTS	"For Youth"	10	1
2022-06-25	BTS	"Born Singer"	21	1
2022-09-10	Twice	"Talk That Talk"	16	1
2022-10-01	Blackpink	"Typa Girl"	14	1
2022-12-03	Jungkook	"Dreamers"	10	1
2023-01-07	NewJeans	"Ditto"	8	2
2023-01-21	NewJeans	"OMG"	1	1
2023-02-11	TXT	"Sugar Rush Ride"	4	1
2023-03-25	Twice	"Set Me Free"	7	1
2023-03-25	Fifty Fifty	"Cupid"	12	1
2023-04-15	Jisoo	"Flower"	4	1
2023-04-22	Agust D & IU	"People Pt. 2"	5	1
2023-06-17	Stray Kids	"S-Class"	19	1
2023-07-22	NewJeans	"New Jeans"	5	1 (R) 2
2023-08-05	NewJeans	"ASAP"	16	1
2023-08-05	NewJeans	"Get Up"	22	1
2023-08-26	V	"Rainy Days"	18	1
2023-09-30	TXT & Anitta	"Back for More"	11	1
2023-10-21	Jennie	"You & Me"	2	1
2023-10-21	NewJeans	"Gods"	19	1
2023-11-11	Le Sserafim	"Perfect Night"	19	2
2023-11-18	Jungkook	"Yes or No"	4	1
2023-11-18	Jungkook	"Hate You"	7	1
2023-11-18	Jungkook	"Shot Glass of Tears"	10	1
2023-12-16	The Weeknd, Jennie & Lily-Rose Depp	"One of the Girls"	1 (Note: Peaked at No. 1 on 23-12-23 (1 week))	2
2024-01-06	Jimin	"Closer Than This"	4	1
2024-04-13	Illit	"Magnetic"	2	1
2024-05-25	RM	"Come Back to Me"	3	1
2024-06-08	NewJeans	"How Sweet"	12	1
2024-11-02	Lisa	"Moonlit Floor (Kiss Me)"	21	1
2024-11-09	Jin	"I'll Be There"	8	1
2024-12-07	Rosé	"Number One Girl"	1	3
2024-12-21	Twice	"Strategy"	1 (Note: Peaked at No. 1 on 2025-07-19 (1 week))	1 (R) 4
2024-12-28	Stray Kids	"Walkin on Water"	8	1
2025-03-15	Lisa feat. Future	"Fxck Up the World"	6	1
2025-03-29	Le Sserafim	"Hot"	9	1
2025-05-24	Rosé	"Messy"	9	1
2025-07-05	Huntrix, Ejae, Audrey Nuna & Rei Ami	"How It's Done"	1	1
2025-07-05	Saja Boys, Andrew Choi, Neckwav, Danny Chung, Kevin Woo & samUIL Lee	"Soda Pop"	9	1
2025-07-05	Huntrix, Ejae, Audrey Nuna & Rei Ami	"What It Sounds Like"	10	1
2025-07-05	Rumi, Jinu, Ejae, Andrew Choi & KPop Demon Hunters Cast	"Free"	15	1
2025-07-12	Twice's Jeongyeon, Jihyo & Chaeyoung	"Takedown"	2	1
2026-01-03	Illit	"Not Cute Anymore"	7	4 (R) 5
2026-02-21	Ateez	"Adrenaline"	19	1
2026-05-16	Cortis	"RedRed"	17	1
2026-06-06	Le Sserafim	"Boompala"	10	1
2026-06-13	Aespa	"Lemonade"	7	1
2026-08-08	Jennie	"Less Than a Lover"	7	1
2026-09-05	Enhypen	"Bloody Paradise"	23	1
2026-09-26	Le Sserafim	"Made My Night"	14	1
2026-10-03	Rosé	"New Trick"	10	2
2026-11-07	Lisa	"Tarantino"	6	1
2026-10-31	K/DA with Mimi Webb, Sophie Powers, Miyeon & Soyeon	"Firestarter"	20	1
2026-11-14	Illit	"You're Under Arrest"	22	1

=== Bubbling Under R&B/Hip-Hop ===
- Chart discontinued after 2020-01-18
2019-07-06 – 2020-01-18

Chart date	Artist	Song/Album title	Peak position	Weeks on chart
2019-07-06	BTS and Juice Wrld	"All Night"	1 (Entered at No. 1 for 1 week)	1

=== Canada AC ===
- Chart name changed from Canada AC Airplay to Canada AC, along with URL on 2024-11-09
- Chart paused in June 2026, needs history check
2025 - June 2026

Chart date	Artist	Song/Album title	Peak position	Weeks on chart
2025-01-11	Rosé & Bruno Mars	"Apt."	5	42
2025-09-20	Huntrix, Ejae, Audrey Nuna & Rei Ami	"Golden"	4	31
2026-05-23	Tame Impala & Jennie	"Dracula" remix	29	2

=== Canada All-Format Airplay ===
- Chart URL changed on 2024-11-09
- Chart paused in June 2026, needs history check
2025 - June 2026

Chart date	Artist	Song/Album title	Peak position	Weeks on chart
2020-09-12	BTS	"Dynamite"	12	22
2021-06-12	BTS	"Butter"	10	13
2021-11-13	Coldplay & BTS	"My Universe"	23	7 (R) 12
2022-08-20	Charlie Puth feat. Jungkook	"Left and Right"	23	12
2024-12-14	Rosé & Bruno Mars	"Apt."	2	45
2025-09-13	Huntrix, Ejae, Audrey Nuna & Rei Ami	"Golden"	4	32
2026-05-09	Tame Impala & Jennie	"Dracula" remix	22	4

=== Canada CHR/Top 40 ===
- Chart URL changed on 2024-11-09
- Chart paused in June 2026, needs history check
2025 - June 2026

Chart date	Artist	Song/Album title	Peak position	Weeks on chart
2018-01-03	BTS feat. Desiigner	"MIC Drop"	44	5
2018-11-10	Steve Aoki feat. BTS	"Waste It on Me"	41	7
2019-04-20	BTS feat. Halsey	"Boy with Luv"	30	9
2020-08-29	BTS	"Dynamite"	7	24
2020-09-12	Blackpink and Selena Gomez	"Ice Cream"	24	10
2021-05-29	BTS	"Butter"	6	20
2021-08-07	BTS	"Permission to Dance"	50	1
2021-10-09	Coldplay & BTS	"My Universe"	30	19
2022-07-16	Charlie Puth feat. Jungkook	"Left and Right"	9	20
2022-08-20	Benny Blanco, BTS & Snoop Dogg	"Bad Decisions"	36	6
2023-05-27	Fifty Fifty	"Cupid"	17	18
2023-08-05	Jungkook feat. Latto	"Seven"	20	11
2023-09-16	Peggy Gou	"(It Goes Like) Nanana"	35	6 (R) 11
2023-10-28	Jungkook & Jack Harlow	"3D"	32	7 (R) 12
2023-11-11	The Kid Laroi, Jungkook & Central Cee	"Too Much"	21	12
2024-11-09	Rosé & Bruno Mars	"Apt."	1 (Total 5 weeks) (Note: Peaked at No. 1 on 2025-02-01 (5 weeks))	31
2024-11-09	Lisa	"Moonlit Floor (Kiss Me)"	21	20
2025-03-01	Rosé	"Toxic Till the End"	27	10
2025-03-15	Lisa feat. Doja Cat & Raye	"Born Again"	38	4
2025-05-24	Maroon 5 & Lisa	"Priceless"	28	11
2025-08-02	Alex Warren & Rosé	"On My Mind"	23	8
2025-08-16	Blackpink	"Jump"	19	11
2025-08-16	Huntrix, Ejae, Audrey Nuna & Rei Ami	"Golden"	2	30
2026-02-21	Huntrix, Ejae, Audrey Nuna & Rei Ami	"How It's Done"	38	1
2026-03-14	Blackpink	"Go"	40	1
2026-04-11	BTS	"Swim"	11	8
2026-04-28	Tame Impala & Jennie	"Dracula" remix	10	6

=== Canada Hot AC ===
- Chart URL changed on 2024-11-09
- Chart paused in June 2026, needs history check
2025 - June 2026

Chart date	Artist	Song/Album title	Peak position	Weeks on chart
2020-09-05	BTS	"Dynamite"	17	28
2021-06-05	BTS	"Butter"	12	20
2021-10-16	Coldplay & BTS	"My Universe"	8	22
2022-07-16	Charlie Puth feat. Jungkook	"Left and Right"	21	1 (R) 20
2023-06-24	Fifty Fifty	"Cupid"	32	3 (R) 16
2023-08-19	Jungkook feat. Latto	"Seven"	32	13
2024-11-16	Rosé & Bruno Mars	"Apt."	1(Total 7 weeks) (Note: Peaked at No. 1 on 2025-03-29 for 7 weeks)	45
2025-03-01	Lisa	"Moonlit Floor (Kiss Me)"	39	1 (R) 3
2025-05-24	Maroon 5 & Lisa	"Priceless"	20	21
2025-09-13	Huntrix, Ejae, Audrey Nuna & Rei Ami	"Golden"	2	38
2026-04-11	BTS	"Swim"	30	8

=== Canadian Digital Song Sales ===
- Chart started 1996-11-16 & last update 2024-11-09
2017-03-04 – 2024-11-09

Chart date	Artist	Song/Album title	Peak position	Weeks on chart
2017-03-04	BTS	"Spring Day"	3	1 (R) 2
2017-10-07	BTS	"DNA"	49	1
2017-12-16	BTS feat. Desiigner	'MIC Drop" (Steve Aoki remix)	7	1
2018-06-02	BTS	"Fake Love"	14	1
2018-09-08	BTS feat. Nicki Minaj	"Idol"	2	1
2018-09-08	BTS	"I'm Fine"	16	1
2018-09-08	BTS	"Euphoria" (Jungkook solo)	19	1
2018-09-08	BTS	"Epiphany" (Jin solo)	28	1
2018-09-08	BTS	"Answer: Love Myself"	30	1
2018-09-08	BTS	"Trivia: Seesaw" (Suga solo)	31	1
2018-09-08	BTS	"Trivia: Just Dance" (J-Hope solo)	33	1
2018-09-08	BTS	"Trivia: Love" (RM solo)	37	1
2018-09-08	BTS	"Serendipity" (full length edition) (Jimin solo)	39	1
2018-11-03	Dua Lipa & Blackpink	"Kiss and Make Up"	10	1
2018-11-03	Steve Aoki feat. BTS	"Waste It on Me"	16	2
2018-11-17	K/DA: (G)I-dle's Miyeon & Soyeon, Madison Beer & Jaira Burns	"Pop/Stars"	30	2
2018-11-24	Jennie	"Solo"	50	1
2019-04-13	Blackpink	"Kill This Love"	29	2
2019-04-27	BTS feat. Halsey	"Boy with Luv"	4	1
2019-04-27	BTS; BTS feat. Lauv	"Make It Right" "Make It Right remix"	25; 20	1 (R) 2
2019-04-27	BTS	"Mikrokosmos"	30	1
2019-04-27	BTS	"Dionysus"	32	1
2019-04-27	BTS	"Home"	33	1
2019-04-27	BTS	"Jamais Vu"	37	1
2019-04-27	BTS	"Intro: Persona"	40	1
2019-06-22	BTS and Charli XCX	"Dream Glow"	17	1
2019-06-29	BTS and Zara Larsson	"A Brand New Day"	30	1
2019-07-06	BTS and Juice Wrld	"All Night"	36	1
2019-07-13	BTS	"Heartbeat"	32	1
2019-07-13	BTS	"Lights"	48	1
2019-10-12	J-Hope feat. Becky G	"Chicken Noodle Soup"	17	1
2019-12-21	Halsey & Suga & BTS	"Suga's Interlude"	25	1
2020-02-01	BTS	"Black Swan"	9	1
2020-03-07	BTS	"On"	2	2
2020-03-07	BTS	"Filter" (Jimin solo)	14	1 (R) 3
2020-03-07	BTS	"We Are Bulletproof: The Eternal"	16	1
2020-03-07	BTS	"Louder Than Bombs"	19	1
2020-03-07	BTS	"My Time" (Jungkook solo)	20	1
2020-03-07	BTS	"Friends" (V, Jimin)	23	1
2020-03-07	BTS	"00:00 (Zero O'Clock)" (Kim Seok-jin, V, Jimin, Jungkook)	24	1
2020-03-07	BTS	"Moon" (Kim Seok-jin solo)	27	1 (R) 2
2020-03-07	BTS	"Ugh!" (RM, J-Hope, Suga)	29	1
2020-03-07	BTS	"Inner Child" (V solo)	30	1
2020-03-07	BTS	"Interlude: Shadow" (Suga solo)	32	1
2020-03-07	BTS	"Outro: Ego" (J-Hope solo)	34	1
2020-03-07	BTS	"Respect" (RM and Suga)	44	1
2020-03-21	Lauv feat. BTS	"Who"	24	1
2020-03-28	V	"Sweet Night"	18	1
2020-05-16	IU feat. Suga	"Eight"	27	1
2020-06-06	Suga (Agust D)	"Daechwita"	9	1 (R) 3
2020-06-06	Lady Gaga and Blackpink	"Sour Candy"	22	2
2020-06-06	Suga (Agust D)	"What Do You Think?"	45	1
2020-06-06	Suga (Agust D)	"Moonlight"	47	1
2020-06-06	Suga (Agust D) feat. Max Schneider	"Burn It"	48	1
2020-06-06	Suga (Agust D) feat. RM	"Strange"	49	1
2020-07-04	BTS	"Stay Gold"	15	1
2020-07-11	Blackpink	"How You Like That"	7	2
2020-07-25	BTS	"Your Eyes Tell"	18	1
2020-09-05	BTS	"Dynamite"	1 (Total 2 weeks)	13 (R) 23
2020-09-12	Blackpink and Selena Gomez	"Ice Cream"	4	5
2020-09-12	K/DA: (G)I-dle & Wolftyla feat. Bea Miller	"The Baddest"	30	1
2020-09-26	Max Schneider feat. Suga	"Blueberry Eyes"	46	1
2020-10-17	Blackpink	"Lovesick Girls"	26	1
2020-11-14	K/DA: (G)I-dle, Madison Beer, Jaira Burns, & Lexie Liu as Seraphine	"More"	48	1
2020-12-05	BTS	"Life Goes On"	2	1
2020-12-05	BTS	"Blue & Grey"	5	1
2020-12-05	BTS	"Stay"	7	1
2020-12-05	BTS	"Telepathy"	8	1
2020-12-05	BTS	"Fly to My Room"	10	1
2020-12-05	BTS	"Dis-ease"	11	1
2021-03-27	Rosé	"On the Ground"	9	1
2021-03-27	Rosé	"Gone"	16	1
2021-04-17	BTS	"Film Out"	5	1
2021-05-15	eAeon feat. RM	"Don't"	35	1
2021-06-05	BTS	"Butter"	1 (Total 2 weeks)	19 (R) 20
2021-07-24	BTS	"Permission to Dance"	1	3
2021-09-25	Lisa	"Lalisa"	7	1
2021-09-25	Lisa	"Money"	14	1
2021-10-09	Coldplay & BTS	"My Universe"	1	18 (R) 22
2021-10-16	Twice	"The Feels"	12	1
2021-11-06	DJ Snake, Ozuna, Megan Thee Stallion & Lisa	"SG"	44	1
2021-11-20	Jin	"Yours"	8	1
2021-12-25	Juice Wrld & Suga	"Girl of My Dreams"	32	1
2022-01-08	V	"Christmas Tree"	2	1
2022-02-26	Jungkook	"Stay Alive"	7	1
2022-04-02	Stray Kids	"Maniac"	49	1
2022-04-16	Big Bang	"Still Life"	28	1
2022-04-30	Seventeen	"Darl+ing"	50	1
2022-05-07	Ha Sung-woon & Jimin	"With You"	4	1
2022-05-14	Psy feat. Suga	"That That"	4	1
2022-06-25	BTS	"Yet to Come"	2	1
2022-06-25	BTS	"Run BTS"	5	1
2022-06-25	BTS	"For Youth"	7	1
2022-06-25	BTS	"Born Singer"	10	1
2022-06-25	BTS	"Singularity"	40	1
2022-07-09	Charlie Puth feat. Jungkook	"Left and Right"	2	4 (R) 11
2022-07-16	J-Hope	"More"	7	1
2022-07-30	J-Hope	"Arson"	27	1
2022-07-30	J-Hope	"=" (Equal Sign)	42	1
2022-07-30	J-Hope	"What If..."	49	1
2022-07-30	J-Hope	"Future"	50	1
2022-08-20	Benny Blanco, BTS & Snoop Dogg	"Bad Decisions"	2	2
2022-09-03	Blackpink	"Pink Venom"	2	1
2022-10-01	Blackpink	"Shut Down"	18	1
2022-10-08	Crush feat. J-Hope	"Rush Hour"	17	1
2022-11-05	Jin	"Super Tuna"	16	1 (R) 2
2022-11-05	Jin	"Abyss"	45	1
2022-11-05	Jin	"Tonight"	48	1
2022-11-12	Jin	"The Astronaut"	3	1
2022-12-03	Jungkook	"Dreamers"	2	2
2022-12-17	RM with Youjeen	"Wild Flower"	10	1
2022-12-17	RM with Anderson .Paak	"Still Life"	29	1
2022-12-17	RM	"Lonely"	30	1
2022-12-17	RM with Paul Blanco & Mahalia	"Closer"	31	1
2022-12-17	RM with Erykah Badu	"Yun"	40	1
2022-12-17	RM with Park Ji-yoon	"No.2"	41	1
2022-12-17	RM with Colde	"Hectic"	42	1
2022-12-17	RM with Tablo	"All Day"	43	1
2022-12-17	RM with Kim Sa-wol	"Forg_tful"	46	1
2022-12-17	RM	"Change Pt.2"	48	1
2023-01-28	Taeyang feat. Jimin	"Vibe"	4	1
2023-02-04	Twice	"Moonlight Sunrise"	22	1
2023-03-18	J-Hope with J. Cole	"On the Street"	4	1
2023-03-18	Jimin	"Promise"	24	1
2023-03-18	Jimin	"Christmas Love"	39	1
2023-03-25	So!YoON! feat. RM	"Smoke Sprite"	27	1
2023-04-01	Jimin	"Set Me Free Pt. 2"	3	2
2023-04-08	Jimin	"Like Crazy"	2	2
2023-04-08	Jimin	"Face-Off"	16	1
2023-04-08	Jimin	"Alone"	17	1
2023-04-08	Jimin	"Interlude: Dive"	27	1
2023-04-15	Jisoo	"Flower"	12	1
2023-04-15	Jisoo	"All Eyes on Me"	17	1
2023-04-22	Agust D & IU	"People Pt. 2"	10	1
2023-05-06	Agust D	"Haegeum"	11	1
2023-05-06	Agust D feat. Ryuichi Sakamoto & Woosung	"Snooze"	22	1
2023-05-06	Agust D feat. J-Hope	"Huh?!"	28	1
2023-05-06	Agust D	"Life Goes On"	30	1
2023-05-06	Agust D	"D-Day"	32	1
2023-05-06	Agust D	"SDL"	36	1
2023-05-06	Agust D	"Amygdala"	38	1
2023-05-06	Agust D	"Polar Night"	39	1
2023-05-06	Agust D	"Interlude: Dawn"	46	1
2023-05-13	Fifty Fifty	"Cupid"	18	6 (R) 9
2023-05-27	BTS	"The Planet"	17	1
2023-05-27	Kodak Black & NLE Choppa feat. Jimin, Jvke, Muni Long	"Angel Pt. 1"	20	2
2023-06-17	Halsey & Suga	"Lilith (Diablo IV Anthem)"	6	1
2023-06-24	BTS	"Take Two"	2	1
2023-07-15	Jungkook	"Still With You"	9	1
2023-07-15	Jungkook	"My You"	13	1
2023-07-22	TXT & Jonas Brothers	"Do It Like That"	13	1
2023-07-22	NewJeans	"Super Shy"	44	1
2023-07-29	Jungkook feat. Latto	"Seven"	1	2 (R) 4
2023-08-26	V	"Love Me Again"	8	2 (R) 3
2023-08-26	V	"Rainy Days"	12	2
2023-09-09	V	"Winter Bear"	48	1
2023-09-23	V	"Slow Dancing"	5	1
2023-09-23	V	"Blue"	22	1
2023-09-23	V	"For Us"	27	1
2023-09-30	TXT & Anitta	"Back For More"	22	1
2023-10-14	Jungkook & Jack Harlow	"3D"	1	2 (R) 3
2023-10-21	Jennie	"You & Me"	8	1
2023-11-04	The Kid Laroi, Jungkook & Central Cee	"Too Much"	2	1
2023-11-18	Jungkook	"Standing Next to You"	2	1 (R) 3
2023-11-18	Jungkook	"Yes or No"	12	1
2023-11-18	Jungkook	"Hate You"	13	1
2023-11-18	Jungkook	"Shot Glass of Tears"	15	1
2023-11-18	Jungkook & DJ Snake	"Please Don't Change"	16	1
2023-11-18	Jungkook	"Too Sad to Dance"	17	1
2023-11-18	Jungkook & Major Lazer	"Closer to You"	18	1
2023-11-18	Jungkook	"Somebody"	23	1
2023-12-30	BTS	"No More Dream"	15	1
2024-01-06	Jimin	"Closer Than This"	5	1
2024-01-13	Umi & V	"Wherever U R"	10	1
2024-03-30	V	"Fri(end)s"	1	2
2024-04-13	J-Hope with Gaeko & Yoon Mi-rae	"Neuron"	20	1
2024-05-18	BTS	"Not Today"	19	1
2024-05-25	RM	"Come Back to Me"	7	1
2024-05-25	Stray Kids feat. Charlie Puth	"Lose My Breath"	24	1
2024-06-08	RM	"Lost"	22	1
2024-06-22	Jungkook	"Never Let Go"	7	1
2024-07-13	Jimin feat. Loco	"Smeraldo Garden Marching Band"	8	1
2024-07-13	Lisa	"Rockstar"	15	1
2024-08-03	Jimin	"Who"	2	1
2024-08-03	Stray Kids	"Chk Chk Boom"	20	1
2024-09-21	Megan Thee Stallion & RM	"Neva Play"	6	1
2024-10-26	Jennie	"Mantra"	18	1
2024-11-02	Rosé & Bruno Mars	"Apt."	3	1

=== Canadian Hot 100 ===
- Chart started 2007-03-31

Chart date	Artist	Song/Album title	Peak position	Weeks on chart
2012-09-08	Psy	"Gangnam Style"	1 (Total 7 weeks) (Note: 2012-10-06 (7 weeks))	26
2013-04-27	Psy	"Gentleman"	9	13
2015-04-25	Exo	"Call Me Baby"	98	1
2015-12-26	Psy feat. CL	"Daddy"	36	6
2016-11-05	BTS	"Blood Sweat & Tears"	86	2
2016-11-26	Blackpink	"Playing with Fire"	92	1
2017-01-07	BigBang	"Fxxk It"	98	1
2017-03-11	BTS	"Not Today"	77	1
2017-03-11	BTS	"Spring Day"	100	1
2017-07-15	Blackpink	"As If It's Your Last"	45	3
2017-10-14	BTS	"DNA"	47	5 (R) 9
2017-12-16	BTS feat. Desiigner	"MIC Drop" (Steve Aoki remix)	37	11
2018-02-17	Red Velvet	"Bad Boy"	87	1
2018-06-02	BTS	"Fake Love"	22	6 (R) 7
2018-06-30	Blackpink	"Ddu-Du Ddu-Du"	22	6 (R) 10
2018-09-08	BTS feat. Nicki Minaj	"Idol"	5	6
2018-09-08	BTS	"I'm Fine"	75	1
2018-09-08	BTS	"Euphoria" (Jungkook solo)	86	1
2018-11-03	Dua Lipa & Blackpink	"Kiss and Make Up"	44	5
2018-11-10	Steve Aoki feat. BTS	"Waste It on Me"	64	5
2018-12-01	Jennie	"Solo"	67	2
2019-01-12	Pinkfong	"Baby Shark"	39	1 (R) 20
2019-04-20	Blackpink	"Kill This Love"	11	9 (R) 10
2019-04-27	BTS feat. Halsey	"Boy with Luv"	7	15
2019-04-27	BTS; BTS feat. Lauv	"Make It Right" "Make It Right remix"	72; 65	1 (R) 2
2019-04-27	BTS	"Home"	75	1
2019-04-27	BTS	"Mikrokosmos"	79	1
2019-04-27	BTS	"Dionysus"	88	1
2019-04-27	BTS	"Jamais Vu"	95	1
2019-07-13	BTS	"Heartbeat"	83	1
2019-10-05	Twice	"Feel Special"	82	2
2019-10-12	J-Hope feat. Becky G	"Chicken Noodle Soup"	55	1
2019-10-19	SuperM	"Jopping"	85	1
2020-02-01	BTS	"Black Swan"	63	1 (R) 3
2020-03-07	BTS	"On"	18	4
2020-03-07	BTS	"Filter" (Jimin solo)	88	1
2020-03-28	Itzy	"Wannabe"	92	1
2020-06-06	Suga (Agust D)	"Daechwita"	100	1
2020-06-13	Lady Gaga and Blackpink	"Sour Candy"	18	3
2020-06-27	Jawsh 685, Jason Derulo & BTS	"Savage Love (Laxed – Siren Beat)"	2	–
2020-07-11	Blackpink	"How You Like That"	11	6 (R) 7
2020-09-05	BTS	"Dynamite"	2	26
2020-09-12	Blackpink and Selena Gomez	"Ice Cream"	11	9
2020-10-17	Blackpink	"Lovesick Girls"	29	3
2020-10-17	Blackpink feat. Cardi B	"Bet You Wanna"	58	1
2020-10-17	Blackpink	"Pretty Savage"	87	1
2020-12-05	BTS	"Life Goes On"	8	2
2020-12-05	BTS	"Blue & Grey"	64	1
2020-12-05	BTS	"Fly to My Room"	65	1
2020-12-05	BTS	"Telepathy"	70	1
2020-12-05	BTS	"Dis-ease"	73	1
2020-12-05	BTS	"Stay"	76	1
2021-03-27	Rosé	"On the Ground"	35	2
2021-03-27	Rosé	"Gone"	77	1
2021-04-17	BTS	"Film Out"	79	1
2021-05-15	Itzy	"In the Morning"	97	1
2021-06-05	BTS	"Butter"	2	20
2021-07-24	BTS	"Permission to Dance"	10	7
2021-09-25	Lisa	"Lalisa"	42	2
2021-10-09	Coldplay & BTS	"My Universe"	9	20
2021-10-09	Lisa	"Money"	37	11 (R) 12
2021-10-16	Twice	"The Feels"	56	2
2021-11-06	DJ Snake, Ozuna, Megan Thee Stallion & Lisa	"SG"	86	1
2021-12-25	Juice Wrld & Suga	"Girl of My Dreams"	56	1
2022-01-08	V	"Christmas Tree"	82	1
2022-02-26	Jungkook	"Stay Alive"	74	1
2022-04-02	Stray Kids	"Maniac"	79	1
2022-04-16	BigBang	"Still Life"	87	1
2022-04-23	Ive	"Love Dive"	92	1
2022-05-14	Psy feat. Suga	"That That"	41	2
2022-06-25	BTS	"Yet to Come"	16	2
2022-06-25	BTS	"Run BTS"	49	1
2022-07-09	Charlie Puth feat. Jungkook	"Left and Right"	17	20
2022-07-16	J-Hope	"More"	75	1
2022-08-20	Benny Blanco, BTS & Snoop Dogg	"Bad Decisions"	31	5
2022-09-03	Blackpink	"Pink Venom"	4	9
2022-09-10	Twice	"Talk That Talk"	65	2
2022-09-03	Ive	"After Like"	96	1
2022-10-01	Blackpink	"Shut Down"	7	8
2022-10-01	Blackpink	"Typa Girl"	51	1
2022-10-01	Blackpink	"Hard to Love"	68	1
2022-10-01	Blackpink	"The Happiest Girl"	81	1
2022-10-01	Blackpink	"Yeah Yeah Yeah"	85	1
2022-10-01	Blackpink	"Tally"	90	1
2022-11-05	Le Sserafim	"Antifragile"	96	1
2022-11-12	Jin	"The Astronaut"	58	1
2022-12-03	Jungkook	"Dreamers"	90	1
2022-12-17	RM with Youjeen	"Wild Flower"	93	1
2022-12-31	NewJeans	"Ditto"	43	11
2023-01-14	NewJeans	"OMG"	35	19
2023-01-28	Taeyang feat. Jimin	"Vibe"	59	1
2023-02-04	Twice	"Moonlight Sunrise"	62	1
2023-02-11	TXT	"Sugar Rush Ride"	73	1
2023-02-18	NewJeans	"Hype Boy"	95	1
2023-03-18	J-Hope with J. Cole	"On the Street"	58	1
2023-03-25	Fifty Fifty	"Cupid"	6	24
2023-03-25	Twice	"Set Me Free"	75	1
2023-04-01	Jimin	"Set Me Free Pt. 2"	45	2
2023-04-08	Jimin	"Like Crazy"	21	4
2023-04-15	Jisoo	"Flower"	30	3
2023-04-29	Ive	"I Am"	93	1
2023-05-06	Agust D	"Haegeum"	74	1
2023-05-20	Le Sserafim feat. Nile Rodgers	"Unforgiven"	92	1
2023-06-03	Kodak Black & NLE Choppa feat. Jimin, Jvke, Muni Long	"Angel Pt. 1"	63	2 (R) 3
2023-06-17	Stray Kids	"S-Class"	96	1
2023-06-24	BTS	"Take Two"	49	1
2023-07-22	NewJeans	"Super Shy"	26	13
2023-07-22	NewJeans	"New Jeans"	62	3
2023-07-29	Jungkook feat. Latto	"Seven"	5	20
2023-08-05	NewJeans	"ETA"	48	1
2023-08-05	NewJeans	"Cool with You"	57	1
2023-08-05	NewJeans	"ASAP"	70	1
2023-08-05	NewJeans	"Get Up"	79	1
2023-08-26	Peggy Gou	"(It Goes Like) Nanana"	69	6 (R) 8
2023-08-26	V	"Love Me Again"	91	1
2023-09-23	V	"Slow Dancing"	60	1
2023-10-14	Jungkook & Jack Harlow	"3D"	10	12 (R) 14
2023-10-21	Jennie	"You & Me"	71	1
2023-10-21	NewJeans	"Gods"	74	1
2023-11-04	The Kid Laroi, Jungkook & Central Cee	"Too Much"	32	6 (R) 7
2023-11-11	Le Sserafim	"Perfect Night"	58	6 (R) 8
2023-11-18	Jungkook	"Standing Next to You"	30	16
2023-11-25	Stray Kids	"Lalalala"	65	1
2023-11-25	The Weeknd, Jennie & Lily-Rose Depp	"One of the Girls"	29	20
2024-02-17	Twice	"I Got You"	96	1
2024-03-09	Le Sserafim	"Easy"	48	4
2024-03-16	Le Sserafim	"Smart"	91	2
2024-03-30	V	"Fri(end)s"	38	1
2024-04-13	Illit	"Magnetic"	37	11
2024-06-08	NewJeans	"How Sweet"	67	1
2024-07-06	NewJeans	"Supernatural"	100	1
2024-07-13	Lisa	"Rockstar"	51	2
2024-08-03	Jimin	"Who"	32	20
2024-08-03	Stray Kids	"Chk Chk Boom"	55	2
2024-08-31	Lisa feat. Rosalía	"New Woman"	80	1
2024-09-14	Le Sserafim	"Crazy"	65	3
2024-09-21	Megan Thee Stallion & RM	"Neva Play"	63	1
2024-10-26	Jennie	"Mantra"	46	5
2024-11-02	Rosé & Bruno Mars	"Apt."	1(Total 7 weeks) (Note: Peaked at No. 1 on 25-03-01 (7 weeks))	51
2024-11-02	Lisa	"Moonlit Floor (Kiss Me)"	88	1
2024-11-09	Aespa	"Whiplash"	90	1
2024-11-30	Jin	"Running Wild"	68	2
2024-12-07	Rosé	"Number One Girl"	63	1 (R) 2
2024-12-21	Rosé	"Toxic Till the End"	54	2 (R) 5
2024-12-21	Twice	"Strategy"	48	1 (R) 20
2025-02-15	Jennie feat. Dominic Fike	"Love Hangover"	72	2
2025-02-22	Lisa feat. Doja Cat & Raye	"Born Again"	53	4
2025-03-08	Jennie feat. Doechii	"ExtraL"	58	3
2025-03-08	Don Toliver, J-Hope & Speedy, feat. Pharrell Williams	"LV Bag"	95	1
2025-03-15	Lisa feat. Future	"Fxck Up the World"	85	1
2025-03-22	Jennie	"Like Jennie"	42	14 (R) 15
2025-03-22	Jennie feat. Dua Lipa	"Handlebars"	47	3
2025-03-22	J-Hope & Miguel	"Sweet Dreams"	79	1
2025-03-29	Le Sserafim	"Hot"	91	1
2025-04-05	J-Hope	"Mona Lisa"	69	1
2025-05-17	Maroon 5 feat. Lisa	"Priceless"	80	1
2025-05-24	Rosé	"Messy"	71	1
2025-05-31	Jin	"Don't Say You Love Me"	87	2
2025-06-28	J-Hope & GloRilla	"Killin' It Girl"	54	2
2025-07-05	Huntrix, Ejae, Audrey Nuna & Rei Ami	"Golden"	1 (Total 6 weeks) (Note: Peaked at No. 1 on 25-09-13 (6 weeks))	26 (R) 43
2025-07-05	Saja Boys, Andrew Choi, Neckwav, Danny Chung, Kevin Woo & SamUIL Lee	"Your Idol"	8	23 (R) 25
2025-07-05	Huntrix, Ejae, Audrey Nuna & Rei Ami	"How It's Done"	9	23 (R) 26
2025-07-05	Saja Boys, Andrew Choi, Neckwav, Danny Chung, Kevin Woo & SamUIL Lee	"Soda Pop"	5	24 (R) 26
2025-07-05	Huntrix, Ejae, Audrey Nuna & Rei Ami	"What It Sounds Like"	15	23 (R) 25
2025-07-12	Rumi, Jinu, Ejae, Andrew Choi	"Free"	21	20
2025-07-12	Alex Warren & Rosé	"On My Mind"	60	2 (R) 7
2025-07-12	Huntrix, Ejae, Audrey Nuna & Rei Ami	"Takedown"	25	20
2025-07-12	Twice's Jeongyeon, Jihyo & Chaeyoung	"Takedown"	45	20
2025-07-26	Blackpink	"Jump"	19	18 (R) 19
2025-09-06	Stray Kids	"Ceremony"	64	1
2025-10-25	Jisoo & Zayn Malik	"Eyes Closed"	39	3
2025-11-08	Le Sserafim & J-Hope	"Spaghetti"	49	4
2025-10-11	Tame Impala & Jennie	"Dracula" remix	2	52 (R) 54
2025-12-06	Stray Kids	"Do It"	56	1
2025-12-27	Illit	"Not Cute Anymore"	72	4
2026-03-14	Blackpink	"Go"	50	1
2026-04-04	BTS	"Swim"	5	20
2026-04-04	BTS	"Body to Body"	20	5
2026-04-04	BTS	"Hooligan"	32	5
2026-04-04	BTS	"Normal"	33	4 (R) 5
2026-04-04	BTS	"Fya"	34	4
2026-04-04	BTS	"Aliens"	37	3
2026-04-04	BTS	"Like Animals"	38	3
2026-04-04	BTS	"2.0"	41	5
2026-04-04	BTS	"Merry Go Round"	43	2
2026-04-04	BTS	"They Don't Know 'Bout Us"	45	3
2026-04-04	BTS	"One More Night"	48	2
2026-04-04	BTS	"Please"	49	2
2026-04-04	BTS	"Into the Sun"	52	1
2026-06-27	Le Sserafim, Illit & Katseye	"Iconic by Mistake"	46	8
2026-06-27	BTS	"Come Over"	66	1
2026-08-08	Jennie	"Less Than a Lover"	82	1
2026-08-22	Stray Kids	"This & That"	77	1
2026-09-19	Lisa	"Sawadika"	70	2
2026-10-31	K/DA with Mimi Webb, Sophie Powers, Miyeon & Soyeon	"Firestarter"	76	3

=== Dance Club Songs ===
- Chart discontinued after 2020-03-28
2006-01-21 – 2020-03-28

Chart date	Artist	Song/Album title	Peak position	Weeks on chart
2006-01-21	Mink	"Glory of LIfe" (in English)	1 (Peaked at No. 1 on 2006-04-08 for 1 week)	16
2007-03-03	S-Blush	"It's My LIfe"	2	16
2008-11-29	BoA	"Eat You Up"	8	16
2009-05-23	BoA	"I Did It for Love" (feat. Sean Garrett)	19	10
2010-03-06	BoA	"Energetic"	17	12

=== Dance Digital Song Sales ===
- Chart started 2010-01-23 and discontinued after 2026-06-27
2012-08-18 – 2026-06-27

Chart date	Artist	Song/Album title	Peak position	Weeks on chart
2012-08-18	Psy	"Gangnam Style"	1 (Note: 2012-09-29 (1 week))	97 (R) 100
2013-04-27	Psy	"Gentleman"	5	16
2014-04-05	Skrillex & Diplo feat. G-Dragon & CL	"Dirty Vibe"	21	2
2014-06-28	Psy feat. Snoop Dogg	"Hangover"	8	2
2015-12-19	Psy feat. CL	"Daddy"	7	4
2016-04-09	Baauer feat. M.I.A. & G-Dragon	"Temple"	36	1
2016-05-28	R3hab, Amber & Luna feat. Xavi & GI	"Wave"	46	1
2016-11-05	Far East Movement & Marshmello feat. Chanyeol & Tinashe	"Freal Luv"	11	2 (R) 3
2018-11-03	Steve Aoki feat. BTS	"Waste It on Me"	2	11
2019-04-06	Steve Aoki & Monsta X	"Play It Cool"	15	2
2020-06-06	Lady Gaga and Blackpink	"Sour Candy"	2	7
2021-01-23	A.C.E	"Fav Boyz"	12	1
2021-04-03	Alesso, Corsak & Stray Kids	"Going Dumb"	5	1
2021-11-06	DJ Snake, Ozuna, Megan Thee Stallion & Lisa	"SG"	3	2
2023-07-01	Peggy Gou	"(It Goes Like) Nanana"	7	17 (R) 18
2023-11-18	Jungkook & DJ Snake	"Please Don't Change"	1	1 (R) 2
2023-11-18	Jungkook & Major Lazer	"Closer to You"	2	1
2024-11-23	Ive feat. David Guetta	"Supernova Love"	9	1
2024-12-07	G-Dragon feat. Taeyang & Daesung	"Home Sweet Home"	3	1
2025-02-15	Lisa feat. Doja Cat & Raye	"Born Again"	3	3 (R) 5
2025-03-08	Jennie feat. Doechii	"ExtraL"	3	1
2025-03-15	Lisa	"Chill"	7	1
2025-07-05	Huntrix, Ejae, Audrey Nuna & Rei Ami	"How It's Done"	1 (Total 7 weeks) (Note: Peaked at No. 1 on 2025-07-12 (2 weeks), 2025-08-30 (4 weeks), 2025-11-22 (1 week))	35
2025-07-05	Huntrix, Ejae, Audrey Nuna & Rei Ami	"Takedown"	1 (Total 6 weeks) (Note: Peaked at No. 1 on 2025-10-25 (6 weeks))	35 (R) 37
2025-07-26	Blackpink	"Jump"	1 (Total 3 weeks)	13 (R) 16
2025-09-06	Stray Kids	"Ceremony"	1	2
2025-11-01	Tame Impala & Jennie	"Dracula" remix	1 (Total 4 weeks) (Note: Peaked at No. 1 on 2026-04-04 (3 weeks), 2026-06-20 (1 week))	5 (R) 25
2026-02-21	Ateez	"Adrenaline"	1	1
2026-03-28	Stray Kids	"Endless Sun"	6	1
2026-04-25	Anyma & Lisa	"Bad Angel"	7	1
2026-05-09	Le Sserafim	"Celebration"	11	1

=== Dance/Mix Show Airplay ===
- Chart started 2003-10-17

Chart date	Artist	Song/Album title	Peak position	Weeks on chart
2018-02-03	BTS feat. Desiigner	"MIC Drop"	37	2
2018-11-17	Steve Aoki feat. BTS	"Waste It on Me"	4	15
2019-05-04	BTS feat. Halsey	"Boy with Luv"	30	4
2020-09-05	BTS	"Dynamite"	16	1 (R) 18
2021-05-08	Alesso with Corsak and Stray Kids	"Going Dumb"	19	9
2021-06-12	BTS	"Butter"	23	12
2022-08-13	Charlie Puth feat. Jungkook	"Left and Right"	32	1 (R) 5
2023-06-17	Fifty Fifty	"Cupid"	27	2 (R) 11
2023-08-05	Peggy Gou	"(It Goes Like) Nanana"	1 (Total 2 weeks) (Note: Peaked at No. 1 on 23-09-23 (2 weeks))	20
2023-08-19	Jungkook feat. Latto	"Seven"	20	7
2024-02-17	Peggy Gou & Lenny Kravitz	"I Believe in Love Again"	25	7
2024-09-21	Peggy Gou	"Find the Way"	8	13
2024-11-23	Rosé & Bruno Mars	"Apt."	13	7 (R) 20
2025-03-29	Lisa feat. Doja Cat & Raye	"Born Again"	38	2
2025-09-13	Huntrix, Ejae, Audrey Nuna & Rei Ami	"Golden"	10	20
2025-09-13	Blackpink	"Jump"	31	5
2026-05-30	Tame Impala & Jennie	"Dracula" remix	26	5
2026-06-13	BTS	"Swim"	40	1
2026-07-25	Peggy Gou feat. Ayra Starr	"Wo, man"	10	13

=== Dance Singles Sales ===
- Chart discontinued after 2013-11-30
2009-11-07 – 2013-11-30

Chart date	Artist	Song/Album title	Peak position	Weeks on chart
2009-11-07	Wonder Girls	"Nobody"	1	15
2012-01-07	Girls' Generation	"The Boys"	5	1

=== Dance Streaming Songs ===
- Chart started 2013-01-17

Chart date	Artist	Song/Album title	Peak position	Weeks on chart
2013-04-20	Psy	Gangnam Style	1 (Total 17 weeks) (Note: 2013-05-11 (17 weeks))	72
2013-04-27	Psy	Gentleman	1 (Total 2 weeks)	20
2014-06-28	Psy feat. Snoop Dogg	Hangover	1	6
2015-12-19	Psy feat. CL	Daddy	5	20
2018-11-10	Steve Aoki feat. BTS	"Waste It on Me"	8	7
2020-06-06	Lady Gaga and Blackpink	"Sour Candy"	3	8
2021-11-06	DJ Snake, Ozuna, Megan Thee Stallion & Lisa	"SG"	5	2
2023-08-05	Peggy Gou	"(It Goes Like) Nanana"	6	9
2025-02-22	Lisa feat. Doja Cat & Raye	"Born Again"	2	4
2025-03-08	Jennie feat. Doechii	"ExtraL"	6	6
2025-07-05	Huntrix, Ejae, Audrey Nuna & Rei Ami	"How It's Done"	1 (Total 25 weeks) (Note: Peaked at No. 1 on 2025-07-12 (25 weeks))	45 (R) 47
2025-07-12	Huntrix, Ejae, Audrey Nuna & Rei Ami	"Takedown"	2	36 (R) 39
2025-07-26	Blackpink	"Jump"	2	13
2025-09-06	Stray Kids	"Ceremony"	5	2
2025-10-11	Tame Impala & Jennie	"Dracula" remix	1 (Total 29 weeks) (Note: Peaked at No. 1 on 2026-05-02 (29 weeks))	58

=== Digital Song Sales ===
- Chart started 2004-10-30/ 2012 – Present

Chart date	Artist	Song/Album title	Peak position	Weeks on chart
2012-09-08	Psy	"Gangnam Style"	1 (Note: Peaked at No. 1 on 2012-10-06 (1 week), (further chart history needs to be researched))	32
2013-05-04	Psy	"Gentleman"	20	4
2017-10-07	BTS	"DNA"	37	1 (R) 2
2017-12-16	BTS feat. Desiigner	"MIC Drop" (Steve Aoki remix)	4	1
2018-06-02	BTS	"Fake Love"	come	2 (R) 3
2018-09-08	BTS feat. Nicki Minaj	"Idol"	1	1
2018-09-08	BTS	"Euphoria (Jungkook solo)"	12	1 (R) 2
2018-09-08	BTS	"I'm Fine"	15	1
2018-09-08	BTS	"Epiphany (Jin solo)"	19	1
2018-09-08	BTS	"Trivia: Seesaw (Suga solo)"	23	1
2018-09-08	BTS	"Answer: Love Myself"	24	1
2018-09-08	BTS	"Trivia: Just Dance (J-Hope solo)"	25	1
2018-09-08	BTS	"Serendipity (Full Length Edition) (Jimin solo)"	29	1
2018-09-08	BTS	"Trivia: Love (RM solo)"	31	1
2018-11-03	Steve Aoki feat. BTS	"Waste It on Me"	14	2
2018-11-03	Dua Lipa & Blackpink	"Kiss and Make Up"	18	1
2018-11-17	K/DA: (G)I-dle's Miyeon & Soyeon, Madison Beer & Jaira Burns	"Pop/Stars"	30	1
2018-11-24	BTS	"2! 3!"	42	1 (R) 2
2019-04-20	Blackpink	"Kill This Love"	39	2
2019-04-27	BTS feat. Halsey	"Boy with Luv"	3	3 (R) 4
2019-04-27	BTS; BTS feat. Lauv	"Make It Right" "Make It Right remix"	13; 8	1 (R) 4
2019-04-27	BTS	"Mikrokosmos"	19	1
2019-04-27	BTS	"Home"	19	1 (R) 2
2019-04-27	BTS	"Dionysus"	28	1 (R) 2
2019-04-27	BTS	"Jamais Vu"	32	1 (R) 2
2019-04-27	BTS	"Intro: Persona"	34	1 (R) 2
2019-06-22	BTS and Charli XCX	"Dream Glow"	10	1
2019-06-29	BTS and Zara Larsson	"A Brand New Day"	25	1
2019-07-06	BTS and Juice Wrld	"All Night"	19	1
2019-07-13	BTS	"Heartbeat"	16	1
2019-07-13	BTS	"Lights"	18	1 (R) 2
2019-10-12	J-Hope feat. Becky G	"Chicken Noodle Soup"	9	1
2019-12-14	Halsey & Suga & BTS	"Suga's Interlude"	10	2
2020-01-18	Younha feat. RM	"Winter Flower"	30	1
2020-02-01	BTS	"Black Swan"	2	1 (R) 2
2020-03-07	BTS	"On"	1	2 (R) 3
2020-03-07	BTS	"My Time" (Jungkook solo)	2	1 (R) 2
2020-03-07	BTS	"Filter" (Jimin solo)	4	1 (R) 4
2020-03-07	BTS	"Friends" (V, Jimin)	6	1
2020-03-07	BTS	"Louder Than Bombs"	8	1
2020-03-07	BTS	"Inner Child" (V solo)	9	1 (R) 2
2020-03-07	BTS	"We Are Bulletproof: The Eternal"	10	1 (R) 3
2020-03-07	BTS	"Ugh!" (RM, J-Hope, Suga)	13	1
2020-03-07	BTS	"00:00 (Zero O'Clock)" (Jin, V, Jimin, Jungkook)	16	1
2020-03-07	BTS	"Moon" (solo by Kim Seok-jin)	17	1
2020-03-07	BTS	"Interlude: Shadow" (solo by Suga)	19	1
2020-03-07	BTS	"Outro: Ego" (solo by J-Hope)	21	1
2020-03-07	BTS	"Respect" (performed by RM and Suga)	26	1
2020-03-21	Lauv feat. BTS	"Who"	14	1
2020-03-28	V	"Sweet Night"	2	1
2020-05-16	IU feat. Suga	"Eight"	13	1
2020-06-06	Suga (Agust D)	"Daechwita"	2	1
2020-06-06	Suga (Agust D) feat. RM	"Strange"	10	1
2020-06-06	Suga (Agust D) feat. Max Schneider	"Burn It"	12	1
2020-06-06	Suga (Agust D)	"What Do You Think?"	13	1
2020-06-06	Suga (Agust D)	"Moonlight"	14	1
2020-06-06	Suga (Agust D)	"People"	16	1
2020-06-06	Suga (Agust D) feat. Niihwa	"28"	19	1
2020-06-06	Suga (Agust D) feat. Kim Jong-wan	"Dear My Friend"	20	1
2020-06-06	Suga (Agust D)	"Interlude: Set Me Free"	22	1
2020-06-06	Suga (Agust D)	"Honsool"	24	1
2020-06-06	Lady Gaga and Blackpink	"Sour Candy"	10	3
2020-07-04	BTS	"Stay Gold"	6	1
2020-07-11	Blackpink	"How You Like That"	2	1
2020-07-25	BTS	"Your Eyes Tell"	12	1
2020-09-05	BTS	"Dynamite"	1 (Total 18 weeks) (Note: Entered at No. 1 for 9 weeks, returned to No. 1 on 2020-11-14 (1 week), 2021-01-02 (2 weeks), 2021-03-06 (6 weeks))	34
2020-09-12	Blackpink and Selena Gomez	"Ice Cream"	2	3 (R) 4
2020-09-12	K/DA: (G)I-dle & Wolftyla feat. Bea Miller	"The Baddest"	28	1
2020-09-19	Jawsh 685, Jason Derulo & BTS	"Savage Love (Laxed – Siren Beat)" (BTS remix released 2020-10-02)	2	–
2020-09-26	Max Schneider feat. Suga	"Blueberry Eyes"	22	1
2020-10-17	Blackpink	"Lovesick Girls"	9	1
2020-10-31	Verivery	"G.B.T.B."	44	1
2020-12-05	BTS	"Life Goes On"	1 (Total 3 weeks) (Note: Entered at No. 1 for 3 weeks)	4 (R) 6
2020-12-05	BTS	"Blue & Grey"	2	2
2020-12-05	BTS	"Stay"	3	1 (R) 2
2020-12-05	BTS	"Telepathy"	4	1
2020-12-05	BTS	"Dis-ease"	5	1
2020-12-05	BTS	"Fly to My Room"	6	1
2020-03-20	Verivery	"Get Away"	44	1
2021-03-27	Rosé	"On the Ground"	10	1
2021-03-27	Rosé	"Gone"	15	1
2021-04-17	BTS	"Film Out"	1	1
2021-05-08	BTS	"Singularity" (V solo)	44	1
2021-05-15	eAeon feat. RM	"Don't"	34	1
2021-06-05	BTS	"Butter", (remix with Megan Thee Stallion released on 2021-08-27)	1 (Total 18 weeks) (Note: Entered at No. 1 for 7 weeks, returned to No. 1 on 2021-07-31 (10 weeks), 2021-12-18 (1 week); remix with Megan Thee Stallion was not credited for status))	21 (R) 24
2021-06-12	BTS	"Stigma" (V solo)	22	1
2021-07-24	BTS	"Permission to Dance"	1	9
2021-08-21	BTS	"Begin" (Jungkook solo)	23	1
2021-08-21	Golden Child	"Ra Pam Pam"	37	1
2021-08-28	ONF	"Popping"	38	1
2021-09-25	Lisa	"Lalisa"	6	1
2021-09-25	Lisa	"Money"	8	1
2021-10-09	Coldplay & BTS	"My Universe"	1 (Total 2 weeks)	12 (R) 14
2021-10-16	Twice	"The Feels"	5	1
2021-11-06	DJ Snake, Ozuna, Megan Thee Stallion & Lisa	"SG"	19	1
2021-11-20	Jin	"Yours"	2	1
2021-12-25	Juice Wrld & Suga	"Girl of My Dreams"	1	1
2022-01-08	V	"Christmas Tree"	1	1
2022-02-26	Jungkook	"Stay Alive"	6	2
2022-04-16	Big Bang	"Still Life"	24	1
2022-04-30	Seventeen	"Darl+ing"	45	1
2022-05-07	Ha Sung-woon & Jimin	"With You"	1	1
2022-05-14	Psy feat. Suga	"That That"	2	1
2022-06-25	BTS	"Yet to Come"	1	3
2022-06-25	BTS	"Run BTS"	3	1
2022-06-25	BTS	"For Youth"	4	1
2022-06-25	BTS	"Born Singer"	7	1
2022-06-25	BTS	"No More Dream"	9	1 (R) 2
2022-07-09	Charlie Puth feat. Jungkook	"Left and Right"	1	17
2022-07-16	J-Hope	"More"	2	1 (R) 3
2022-07-30	J-Hope	"Arson"	2	1
2022-07-30	J-Hope	"=" (Equal Sign)	9	1 (R) 2
2022-07-30	J-Hope	"Safety Zone"	11	1
2022-07-30	J-Hope	"Pandora's Box"	12	1
2022-07-30	J-Hope	"Future"	13	1
2022-07-30	J-Hope	"What If..."	14	1
2022-07-30	J-Hope	"Stop"	15	1
2022-07-30	J-Hope	"Music Box: Reflection"	19	1
2022-08-20	Benny Blanco, BTS & Snoop Dogg	"Bad Decisions"	1	5
2022-09-03	Blackpink	"Pink Venom"	3	2
2022-09-10	Balming Tiger's Omega Sapien, bj Wnjn & Mudd the Student, feat. RM	"Sexy Nukim"	30	2
2022-10-01	Blackpink	"Shut Down"	11	1
2022-10-01	Crush feat. J-Hope	"Rush Hour"	5	2
2022-10-01	Blackpink	"Typa Girl"	49	1
2022-11-05	Jin	"Super Tuna"	3	1 (R) 2
2022-11-05	Jin	"Abyss"	39	1
2022-11-05	Jin	"Tonight"	42	1
2022-11-12	Jin	"The Astronaut"	1	3
2022-12-03	Jungkook	"Dreamers"	1	2
2022-12-17	RM with Youjeen	"Wild Flower"	1	1
2022-12-17	RM with Anderson .Paak	"Still Life"	10	1
2022-12-17	RM with Erykah Badu	"Yun"	14	1
2022-12-17	RM with Paul Blanco & Mahalia	"Closer"	15	1
2022-12-17	RM	"Lonely"	16	1
2022-12-17	RM with Tablo	"All Day"	18	1
2022-12-17	RM with Colde	"Hectic"	19	1
2022-12-17	RM with Park Ji-yoon	"No.2"	20	1
2022-12-17	RM with Kim Sa-wol	"Forg_tful"	22	1
2022-12-17	RM	"Change Pt.2"	23	1
2023-01-28	Taeyang feat. Jimin	"Vibe"	2	1
2023-02-04	Twice	"Moonlight Sunrise"	3	1
2023-02-11	TXT	"Sugar Rush Ride"	15	1
2023-02-18	BTS	"Attack On Bangtan"	28	1
2023-03-18	Jimin	"Promise"	18	1
2023-03-18	J-Hope with J. Cole	"On the Street"	2	3
2023-03-25	So!YoON! feat. RM	"Smoke Sprite"	9	1
2023-03-25	Twice	"Set Me Free"	22	1
2023-04-01	Jimin	"Set Me Free Pt. 2"	1	3
2023-04-08	Jimin	"Like Crazy"	1 (Total 2 weeks)	5 (R) 7
2023-04-08	Jimin	"Face-Off"	8	1
2023-04-08	Jimin	"Alone"	12	1
2023-04-08	Jimin	"Interlude: Dive"	15	1
2023-04-22	Agust D & IU	"People Pt. 2"	1	1
2023-05-06	Agust D	"Haegeum"	1	2
2023-05-06	Agust D feat. J-Hope	"Huh?!"	8	1
2023-05-06	Agust D	"Amygdala"	12	1
2023-05-06	Agust D feat. Ryuichi Sakamoto & Woosung	"Snooze"	13	1
2023-05-06	Agust D	"D-Day"	15	1
2023-05-06	Agust D	"Life Goes On"	19	1
2023-05-06	Agust D	"SDL"	20	1
2023-05-06	Agust D	"Polar Night"	24	1
2023-05-06	Agust D	"Interlude: Dawn"	26	1
2023-05-13	Fifty Fifty	"Cupid"	10	9
2023-05-13	Colde feat. RM	"Don't Ever Say Love Me"	43	1
2023-05-27	BTS	"The Planet"	6	1
2023-05-27	Kodak Black & NLE Choppa feat. Jimin, Jvke, Muni Long	"Angel Pt. 1"	1 (Note: Peaked at No. 1 on 23-06-03 (1 week))	2 (R) 3
2023-06-17	Halsey & Suga	"Lilith (Diablo IV Anthem)"	5	2
2023-06-17	Stray Kids	"S-Class"	22	1
2023-06-24	BTS	"Take Two"	1	2
2023-07-15	Jungkook	"Still With You"	6	1
2023-07-15	Jungkook	"My You"	10	1
2023-07-22	TXT & Jonas Brothers	"Do It Like That"	3	1 (R) 2
2023-07-22	NewJeans	"Super Shy"	45	1
2023-07-29	Jungkook feat. Latto	"Seven"	2	4 (R) 8
2023-08-26	V	"Love Me Again"	3	1 (R) 2
2023-08-26	V	"Rainy Days"	4	1 (R) 2
2023-09-09	V	"Winter Bear"	36	1
2023-09-09	Blackpink	"The Girls"	39	1
2023-09-09	V feat. Peakboy	"Snowflower"	43	1
2023-09-09	V	"Scenery"	46	1
2023-09-23	V	"Slow Dancing"	2	1
2023-09-23	V	"Blue"	12	1
2023-09-23	V	"For Us"	25	1
2023-09-30	TXT & Anitta	"Back For More"	3	1
2023-10-14	Jungkook & Jack Harlow	"3D"	1 (Total 2 weeks)	4 (R) 6
2023-10-21	Jennie	"You & Me"	6	1
2023-10-28	TXT	"Chasing That Feeling"	12	1
2023-11-04	The Kid Laroi, Jungkook & Central Cee	"Too Much"	1	1
2023-11-18	Jungkook	"Standing Next to You"	1 (Total 5 weeks) (Note: Entered at No. 1 (3 weeks), returned to No. 1 on 2023-12-16 (1 week), 2023-12-30 (1 week))	20
2023-11-18	Jungkook	"Yes or No"	4	1
2023-11-18	Jungkook	"Hate You"	5	1
2023-11-18	Jungkook & DJ Snake	"Please Don't Change"	8	1
2023-11-18	Jungkook & Major Lazer	"Closer to You"	10	1
2023-11-18	Jungkook	"Somebody"	12	1
2023-11-18	Jungkook	"Shot Glass of Tears"	13	1
2023-11-18	Jungkook	"Too Sad to Dance"	15	1
2023-12-23	BTS	"Spring Day"	5	1
2023-12-23	BTS	"Outro: Tear"	22	1
2024-01-06	Jimin	"Closer Than This"	1	1
2024-01-13	Umi & V	"Wherever U R"	5	1
2024-02-03	BTS	"Danger"	16	1
2024-02-17	Twice	"I Got You"	24	1
2024-03-30	V	"Fri(end)s"	2	3
2024-04-13	J-Hope with Gaeko & Yoon Mi-rae	"Neuron"	5	1
2024-04-13	J-Hope with Jungkook	"I Wonder..."	12	1
2024-05-18	BTS	"Not Today"	13	1
2024-05-25	RM	"Come Back to Me"	24	1
2024-05-25	Stray Kids feat. Charlie Puth	"Lose My Breath"	8	1
2024-06-08	RM	"Lost"	5	1
2024-06-08	RM	"Nuts"	14	1
2024-06-08	RM	"Right People, Wrong Place"	15	1
2024-06-08	RM	"Groin"	18	1
2024-06-08	RM & Little Simz	"Domodachi"	19	1
2024-06-08	RM	"Heaven"	20	1
2024-06-08	RM & Moses Sumney	"Around the World in a Day"	21	1
2024-06-08	RM	"Out Of Love"	22	1
2024-06-08	RM, Domi and JD Beck	"? (Interlude)"	24	1
2024-06-08	RM	"ㅠㅠ (Credit Roll)"	25	1
2024-06-22	Jungkook	"Never Let Go"	3	1
2024-07-13	Jimin feat. Loco	"Smeraldo Garden Marching Band"	3	1
2024-07-13	Lisa	"Rockstar"	7	1
2024-08-03	Jimin	"Who"	1 (Total 2 weeks)	5 (R) 11
2024-08-03	Stray Kids	"Chk Chk Boom"	3	1
2024-08-03	Jimin	"Be Mine"	21	1
2024-09-07	Suga (Agust D)	"The Last"	12	1
2024-09-21	Megan Thee Stallion & RM	"Neva Play"	1	1
2024-10-19	Lisa	"Moonlit Floor (Kiss Me)"	23	1
2024-10-26	Jennie	"Mantra"	10	1
2024-11-02	Rosé & Bruno Mars	"Apt."	1 (Note: Peaked at No. 1 on 2025-01-25 (1 week))	38 (R) 39
2024-11-09	Jin	"I'll Be There"	3	1
2024-11-30	Jin	"Running Wild"	1	1
2024-11-30	Jin & Wendy	"Heart on the Window"	20	1
2024-11-30	Jin	"Another Level"	22	1
2024-11-30	Jin	"I Will Come to You"	23	1
2024-11-30	Jin	"Falling"	25	1
2024-12-14	V & Park Hyo-shin	"Winter Ahead"	1	1
2024-12-21	V & Bing Crosby	"White Christmas" (remix)	1	1
2024-12-28	Stray Kids	"Walkin on Water"	5	1
2025-01-11	J-Hope	"Blue Side" (Outro)	13	1
2025-02-08	Jin	"Close to You"	9	1
2025-03-08	Don Toliver, J-Hope & Speedy, feat. Pharrell Williams	"LV Bag"	8	1
2025-03-15	Lisa feat. Future	"Fxck Up the World"	24	1
2025-03-22	J-Hope & Miguel	"Sweet Dreams"	1	2
2025-04-05	J-Hope	"Mona Lisa"	1	2
2025-05-17	Tablo & RM	"Stop the Rain"	4	1
2025-05-31	Jin	"Don't Say You Love Me"	1	2
2025-06-28	J-Hope & GloRilla	"Killin' It Girl"	1	2
2025-06-28	Ateez	"Lemon Drop"	9	1
2025-07-12	Huntrix, Ejae, Audrey Nuna & Rei Ami	"Golden"	1 (Total 6 weeks) (Note: Peaked at No. 1 on 25-09-06 (4 weeks), 2025-12-13 (1 week), 2026-03-28 (1 week))	52 (R) 53
2025-07-12	Huntrix, Ejae, Audrey Nuna & Rei Ami	"What It Sounds Like"	4	3 (R) 18
2025-07-12	Saja Boys, Andrew Choi, Neckwav, Danny Chung, Kevin Woo & SamUIL Lee	"Your Idol"	8	3 (R) 15
2025-07-19	Saja Boys, Andrew Choi, Neckwav, Danny Chung, Kevin Woo & SamUIL Lee	"Soda Pop"	5	19
2025-07-19	Huntrix, Ejae, Audrey Nuna & Rei Ami	"How It's Done"	6	1 (R) 14
2025-07-26	Blackpink	"Jump"	3	1
2025-07-26	Ateez	"In Your Fantasy"	7	1
2025-08-23	Huntrix, Ejae, Audrey Nuna & Rei Ami	"Takedown"	9	6 (R) 11
2025-08-23	Rumi, Jinu, Ejae, Andrew Choi & KPop Demon Hunters Cast	"Free"	13	5
2025-09-06	Stray Kids	"Ceremony"	3	2
2025-09-06	BTS	"21st Century Girl"	15	1
2025-10-25	Jisoo & Zayn Malik	"Eyes Closed"	7	1
2025-11-08	Le Sserafim & J-Hope	"Spaghetti"	4	1
2025-11-08	Ejae	"In Another World"	12	1
2025-12-06	Stray Kids	"Do It"	10	1
2025-12-20	BTS	"Anpanman"	7	1
2026-03-14	Blackpink	"Go"	25	1
2026-04-04	BTS	"Swim"	1 (Total 4 weeks)	6
2026-04-04	BTS	"Body to Body"	3	1
2026-04-04	BTS	"Normal"	1 (Note: Peaked at No. 1 on 2026-08-01 (1 week)))	1 (R) 3
2026-04-04	BTS	"Fya"	5	1
2026-04-04	BTS	"Like Animals"	6	1
2026-04-04	BTS	"Hooligan"	7	1
2026-04-04	BTS	"They Don't Know 'Bout Us"	8	1
2026-04-04	BTS	"2.0"	9	1
2026-04-04	BTS	"Aliens"	4	1 (R) 2
2026-04-04	BTS	"Into the Sun"	11	1
2026-04-04	BTS	"Please"	12	1
2026-04-04	BTS	"One More Night"	13	1
2026-04-04	BTS	"Merry Go Round"	15	1
2026-04-11	Tame Impala & Jennie	"Dracula" remix	7	25 (R) 30
2026-06-06	Le Sserafim	"Boompala"	9	1
2026-06-13	Aespa	"Lemonade"	11	1
2026-06-27	BTS	"Come Over"	1	1
2026-06-27	Le Sserafim, Illit & Katseye	"Iconic by Mistake"	12	1
2026-07-04	Stray Kids	"Run It"	9	1
2026-08-22	Stray Kids	"This & That"	4	1
2026-09-19	Lisa	"Sawadika"	7	1
2026-10-03	Rosé	"New Trick"	25	1
2026-11-07	Ateez	"Drip"	21	1

=== Global Dance Songs ===
- Chart started 2006-12-02/ discontinued after 2013-06-29
2006-12-02 – 2013-06-29

Chart date	Artist	Song/Album title	Peak position	Weeks on chart
2007-05-12	S-Blush	"It's My LIfe"	38	1

=== Heatseeker Songs ===
- Chart discontinued after 2014-11-29
2009-10-31 – 2014-11-29

Chart date	Artist	Song/Album title	Peak position	Weeks on chart
2009-10-31	Wonder Girls	"Nobody"	4	1
2013-02-19	Girls' Generation	"The Boys"	17	2

=== Hot Alternative Songs ===
Chart date	Artist	Song/Album title	Peak position	Weeks on chart
2021-10-09	Coldplay & BTS	"My Universe"	1 (Total 3 weeks) (Note: Entered at No. 1 (2 weeks), returned to No. 1 on 2021-10-30 (1 week))	19
2022-07-16	J-Hope	"More"	6	3
2022-07-30	J-Hope	"What If..."	23	1
2023-06-17	Halsey & Suga	"Lilith (Diablo IV Anthem)"	10	2
2025-10-11	Tame Impala & Jennie	"Dracula" remix	1 (Total 26 weeks) (Note: Peaked at No. 1 on 2026-05-02 (1 week), 2026-05-16 (3 weeks), 2026-06-13 (19 weeks), 2026-11-07 (3 weeks))	59
2026-10-03	Rosé	"New Trick"	23	1 (R) 2

=== Hot Dance/Electronic Songs ===
- Chart started 2010-01-23 and revamped on 2025-01-18

Chart date	Artist	Song/Album title	Peak position	Weeks on chart
2013-01-26	Psy	"Gangnam Style"	4	13
2013-04-24	Psy	"Gentleman"	1 (Note: 2013-05-04 (1 week))	20
2014-04-05	Skrillex and Diplo feat. G-Dragon & CL	"Dirty Vibe"	15	18
2014-06-28	Psy feat. Snoop Dogg	"Hangover"	4	21
2015-12-19	Psy feat. CL	"Daddy"	6	20
2016-04-09	Baauer feat. M.I.A. & G-Dragon	"Temple"	26	1
2016-11-05	Far East Movement & Marshmello feat. Chanyeol & Tinashe	"Freal Luv"	20	6 (R) 10
2017-06-03	Psy	"New Face"	27	3
2017-06-03	Psy	"I Luv It"	29	2
2018-11-03	Steve Aoki feat. BTS	"Waste It on Me"	6	20
2019-04-06	Steve Aoki & Monsta X	"Play It Cool"	20	3
2020-06-06	Lady Gaga and Blackpink	"Sour Candy"	3	26
2021-04-03	Alesso with Corsak and Stray Kids	"Going Dumb"	13	20
2021-11-06	DJ Snake, Ozuna, Megan Thee Stallion & Lisa	"SG"	4	26
2023-07-01	Peggy Gou	"(It Goes Like) Nanana"	5	26
2023-11-18	Jungkook & DJ Snake	"Please Don't Change"	5	7
2023-11-18	Jungkook & Major Lazer	"Closer to You"	6	6
2023-11-25	Peggy Gou & Lenny Kravitz	"I Believe in Love Again"	50	1
2024-11-23	Ive feat. David Guetta	"Supernova Love"	14	4
2024-12-07	G-Dragon feat. Taeyang & Daesung	"Home Sweet Home"	23	5
2025-02-01	Odetari & Ateez's Hongjoong	"SMB"	21	1
2025-11-01	Tame Impala & Jennie	"Dracula" remix	1 (Total 45 weeks) (Note: Entered at No. 1 for 3 weeks, returned to No. 1 on 2025-12-20 (2 weeks), 2026-02-21 (40 weeks))	56
2026-04-25	Anyma & Lisa	"Bad Angel"	8	4

=== Hot Dance/Pop Songs ===
- Chart started 2025-01-18

Chart date	Artist	Song/Album title	Peak position	Weeks on chart
2025-01-18	G-Dragon feat. Taeyang & Daesung	"Home Sweet Home"	15	1
2025-02-22	Lisa feat. Doja Cat & Raye	"Born Again"	2	8
2025-03-08	Jennie feat. Doechii	"ExtraL"	6	14
2025-03-15	Lisa	"Moonlit Floor (Kiss Me)"	14	1
2025-03-15	Lisa	"Chill"	15	1
2025-07-05	Huntrix, Ejae, Audrey Nuna & Rei Ami	"How It's Done"	1 (Total 29 weeks) (Note: Peaked at No. 1 on 2025-07-12 (29 weeks))	47
2025-07-05	Huntrix, Ejae, Audrey Nuna & Rei Ami	"Takedown"	2	42
2025-07-26	Blackpink	"Jump"	2	26
2025-09-06	Stray Kids	"Ceremony"	4	7 (R) 8
2026-02-21	Ateez	"Adrenaline"	10	4
2026-05-09	Le Sserafim	"Celebration"	12	1
2026-05-09	Cortis	"RedRed"	8	22
2026-05-23	Illit	"It's Me"	10	1 (R) 9
2026-06-13	Aespa	"Lemonade"	11	2 (R) 6
2026-09-19	Jisoo	"Click"	15	1
2026-09-26	Le Sserafim	"Made My Night"	7	3
2026-10-31	K/DA with Mimi Webb, Sophie Powers, Miyeon & Soyeon	"Firestarter"	6	4
2026-10-31	A2O Lite	"Neon"	15	2 (R) 3
2026-11-07	Illit	"You're Under Arrest"	6	3

=== Hot Latin Songs ===
- Chart started 1986-09-06

Chart date	Artist	Song/Album title	Peak position	Weeks on chart
2021-11-06	DJ Snake, Ozuna, Megan Thee Stallion & Lisa	"SG"	11	10

=== Hot R&B/Hip-Hop Singles Sales ===
- Chart started 1992-07-11/ discontinued after 2013-11-30
1992-07-11 – 2013-11-30

Chart date	Artist	Song/Album title	Peak position	Weeks on chart
2007-07-28	Skull	"Boom Di Boom Di"	3	19

=== Hot R&B/Hip-Hop Songs ===
Chart date	Artist	Song/Album title	Peak position	Weeks on chart
2007-08-04	Skull	"Boom Di Boom Di"	80	10
2021-10-23	Lisa	"Money"	36	4 (R) 6
2021-12-25	Juice Wrld & Suga	"Girl of My Dreams"	3	4
2023-03-18	J-Hope with J. Cole	"On the Street"	14	2
2023-06-03	Kodak Black & NLE Choppa feat. Jimin, Jvke, Muni Long	"Angel Pt. 1"	18	1 (R) 3
2023-12-09	The Weeknd, Jennie & Lily-Rose Depp	"One of the Girls"	17	22
2024-09-21	Megan Thee Stallion & RM	"Neva Play"	7	4
2025-03-08	Don Toliver, J-Hope & Speedy, feat. Pharrell Williams	"LV Bag"	27	1
2025-03-15	Lisa feat. Future	"Fxck Up the World"	36	1

=== Hot R&B Songs ===
Chart date	Artist	Song/Album title	Peak position	Weeks on chart
2023-07-08	The Weeknd, Jennie & Lily-Rose Depp	"One of the Girls"	4	4 (R) 34
2024-01-13	Umi & V	"Wherever U R"	20	1
2025-03-22	Jennie, Childish Gambino & Kali Uchis	"Damn Right"	24	1

=== Hot Rap Songs ===
Chart date	Artist	Song/Album title	Peak position	Weeks on chart
2012-10-13	Psy	"Gangnam Style"	1 (Total 9 weeks) (Note: 2012-10-20 (8 weeks), 2013-01-12 (1 week))	28
2013-04-27	Psy	"Gentleman"	3	13 (R) 14
2014-06-28	Psy feat. Snoop Dogg	"Hangover"	3	2
2021-12-25	Juice Wrld & Suga	"Girl of My Dreams"	3	1
2022-07-30	J-Hope	"Arson"	21	1
2023-03-18	J-Hope with J. Cole	"On the Street"	6	2
2023-05-06	Agust D	"Haegeum"	9	1
2023-06-03	Kodak Black & NLE Choppa feat. Jimin, Jvke, Muni Long	"Angel Pt. 1"	11	1
2024-07-13	Lisa	"Rockstar"	19	2
2024-09-21	Megan Thee Stallion & RM	"Neva Play"	5	2
2025-03-08	Don Toliver, J-Hope & Speedy, feat. Pharrell Williams	"LV Bag"	15	1
2025-03-15	Lisa feat. Future	"Fxck Up the World"	20	1
2026-11-07	Lisa	"Sawadika"	16	1

=== Hot Rock & Alternative Songs ===
Chart date	Artist	Song/Album title	Peak position	Weeks on chart
2021-10-09	Coldplay & BTS	"My Universe"	1 (Total 3 weeks)	26
2022-07-16	J-Hope	"More"	9	3
2022-07-30	J-Hope	"What If..."	36	1
2023-06-17	Halsey & Suga	"Lilith (Diablo IV Anthem)"	16	2
2025-07-12	d4vd feat. Hyunjin	"Always Love"	49	1
2025-10-11	Tame Impala & Jennie	"Dracula" remix	1 (Total 26 weeks) (Note: Peaked at No. 1 on 2026--5-02 (1 week) and on 2026-05-16 (3 weeks), 2026-06-16 (19 weeks), 2026-11-07 (3 weeks))	59
2026-10-03	Rosé	"New Trick"	26	8

=== Hot Singles Sales ===
- Chart reduced from 50 to 25 on 2010-12-04/ from 25 to 15 on 2014-12-06
- Chart discontinued after 2017-11-25
2001-12-12 – 2017-11-25

Chart date	Artist	Song/Album title	Peak position	Weeks on chart
2001-12-22	Kim Bum-soo (listed as BSK)	"Hello Goodbye Hello" (English release)	51	1
2007-07-28	Skull	"Boom Di Boom Di"	14	7 (R) 12
2009-10-31	Wonder Girls	"Nobody"	1 (Entered at No. 1 for 2 weeks)	6 (R) 23
2012-01-07	Girls' Generation	"The Boys"	15	1
2012-06-02	JJ Project	"Bounce"	14	2
2013-03-23	Psy	"Gangnam Style"	4	3
2014-06-14	VIXX	"Eternity"	3	2 (R) 3
2015-03-14	VIXX	"Love Equation"	12	1
2016-05-14	VIXX	"Dynamite"	15	1
2016-09-03	VIXX	"Fantasy"	4	1
2017-06-10	iKon	"Bling Bling"	2	2
2017-06-17	KNK	"Sun, Moon, Star"	11	1
2017-07-29	One	"Heyahe"	8	2
2017-08-12	Akdong Musician	"Dinosaur"	6	1
2017-09-23	Exo	"Power"	2	3
2017-10-21	U-Know Yunho (listed as TVXQ)	"Drop"	14	1

=== Hot Trending Songs (Powered by Twitter) ===
The Hot Trending Songs chart posts both daily and weekly version. The daily version is not included here.

- Chart started 2021-10-30
- Chart was revamped and skipped the chart dated 2022-10-29
- Chart has been paused after 2023-09-30
2021-10-30 – 2023-09-30

Chart date	Artist	Song/Album title	Peak position	Weeks on chart
2021-10-30	BTS	"Permission to Dance"	1	13 (R) 24
2021-10-30	Lisa	"Money"	2	7 (R) 47
2021-10-30	Lisa	"Lalisa"	1 (Total 4 weeks) (Note: Peaked at No. 1 on 2022-08-06 for 1 week, 2022-08-20 (1 week), 2022-09-17 (1 week), 2022-10-08 (1 week))	54 (R) 60
2021-10-30	Coldplay & BTS	"My Universe"	2	7 (R) 8
2021-10-30	Enhypen	"Tamed-Dashed"	5	2 (R) 3
2021-10-30	Aespa	"Savage"	6	3 (R) 4
2021-10-30	BTS	"Butter"	1 (Total 20 weeks) (Note: Peaked at No. 1 on 2021-11-06 for 5 weeks, returned to No. 1 on 2021-12-18 (1 week), 2022-02-05 (14 weeks))	35 (R) 36
2021-10-30	NCT 127	"Sticker"	9	3 (R) 6
2021-10-30	Stray Kids	"Thunderous"	10	1 (R) 2
2021-10-30	Twice	"The Feels"	11	3
2020-10-30	BTS	"Dynamite"	9	18 (R) 22
2021-10-30	Itzy	"Loco"	14	3
2021-10-30	Enhypen	"Go Big or Go Home"	16	1
2021-10-30	Enhypen	"Just a Little Bit"	18	1
2021-10-30	IU	"Strawberry Moon"	20	1
2021-11-06	Seventeen	"Rock with You"	2	4
2021-11-06	Enhypen	"Upper Side Dreamin'"	11	2
2021-11-06	BTS featuring Halsey	"Boy with Luv"	14	6 (R) 7
2021-11-06	Enhypen	"Blockbuster"	18	1
2021-11-13	NCT 127	"Favorite (Vampire)"	2	4 (R) 5
2021-11-13	The Boyz	"Maverick"	11	3
2021-11-20	Jin	"Yours"	3	49
2021-11-20	MJ feat. Taeyeon	"Get Set Yo"	18	1
2021-11-20	Blackpink	"How You Like That"	19	1 (R) 2
2021-11-27	Twice	"Scientist"	4	3 (R) 4
2021-11-27	TXT	"Frost"	19	1
2021-12-04	Monsta X	"Rush Hour"	9	2
2021-12-04	Stray Kids	"Christmas EveL"	4	3
2021-12-04	Jungkook	"Falling" (cover)	20	1
2021-12-11	Kai	"Peaches"	3	8 (R) 10
2021-12-11	Stray Kids	"Winter Falls"	10	2
2021-12-18	Ive	"Eleven"	4	8
2021-12-18	Jin	"Super Tuna"	4	45
2021-12-18	NCT U	"Universe (Let's Play Ball)"	13	2 (R) 3
2021-12-18	Ateez	"Turbulence"	11	2
2021-12-25	Ateez	"The Real"	6	1
2021-12-25	Monsta X	"The Dreaming"	12	2
2021-12-25	Juice Wrld & Suga	"Girl of My Dreams"	16	1 (R) 2
2021-12-25	Monsta X	"You Problem"	19	1
2022-01-01	NCT	"Dreaming"	5	1
2022-01-01	Aespa	"Dreams Come True (Aespa version)"	10	2 (R) 3
2022-01-01	NCT	"Earthquake"	12	1
2022-01-01	V	"Christmas Tree"	4	24 (R) 25
2022-01-01	Mew Suppasit & Sam Kim	"Before 4:30 (She Said...)"	4	16
2022-01-08	BamBam feat. Seulgi	"Who Are You"	6	4 (R) 45
2022-01-08	NCT U	"Sweet Dream"	13	1
2022-01-08	NCT U	"Beautiful"	20	1
2022-01-08	NCT U	"OK!"	20	1
2022-01-22	Enhypen	"Blessed-Cursed"	4	3
2022-01-22	Woozi (Seventeen)	"Ruby"	17	1
2022-01-29	BamBam	"Slow Mo"	3	40 (R) 44
2022-01-29	Enhypen	"Polaroid Love"	7	7
2022-02-05	Got the Beat	"Step Back"	16	2
2022-02-19	Mark Lee	"Child"	9	2
2022-02-19	Jungkook	"Stay Alive"	2	19
2022-02-26	Taeyeon	"INVU"	14	3
2022-03-05	Treasure	"Jikjin"	2	4 (R) 5
2022-03-05	Treasure	"U"	15	2
2022-03-05	Nmixx	"O.O"	19	3
2022-03-19	Kihyun	"Voyager"	17	2
2022-03-19	Treasure	"Darari"	11	3
2022-03-26	Stray Kids	"Maniac"	2	8 (R) 14
2022-03-26	(G)I-dle	"Tomboy"	13	3
2022-04-09	NCT Dream	"Glitch Mode"	2	5
2022-04-09	Red Velvet	"Feel My Rhythm"	16	1
2022-04-16	Ive	"Love Dive"	9	5 (R) 6
2022-04-16	Big Bang	"Still Life"	17	2
2022-04-30	Seventeen	"Darl+ing"	4	1
2022-04-30	BamBam feat. Mayzin	"Wheels Up"	7	27 (R) 30
2022-04-30	Dreamcatcher	"Maison"	17	1
2022-05-07	Ha Sung-woon & Jimin	"With You"	1 (Total 7 Weeks) (Note: Peaked at No. 1 on 2022-05-14 for 6 weeks, returned to No. 1 on 2022-08-13 (1 week))	26 (R) 27
2022-05-14	Psy feat. Suga	"That That"	3	4
2022-05-14	iKon	"But You"	7	3
2022-05-21	BTS	"Yet to Come (The Most Beautiful Moment)"	1 (Total 3 weeks) (Note: Peaked at No. 1 on 2022-06-18 for 3 weeks)	22 (R) 28
2022-06-04	Astro	"Candy Sugar Pop"	10	1
2022-06-11	Seventeen	"Hot"	3	2
2022-06-11	Got7	"Nanana"	5	2 (R) 3
2022-06-11	NCT Dream	"Beatbox"	3	4
2022-06-18	BTS	"Run BTS"	2	3 (R) 13
2022-06-18	BTS	"For Youth"	3	3
2022-07-02	Charlie Puth feat. Jungkook	"Left and Right"	3	9 (R) 12
2022-07-09	J-Hope	"More"	1 (Total 2 weeds) (Note: Peaked second week at No. 1 on 2022-07-16 for 2 weeks)	7
2022-07-09	Kep1er	"Up!"	18	1
2022-07-09	Loona	"Flip That"	20	1
2022-07-16	Enhypen	"Future Perfect (Pass the Mic)"	2	2
2022-07-16	Nayeon	"Pop!"	16	1
2022-07-16	Enhypen	"TFW (That Feeling When)"	19	2
2022-07-23	Aespa	"Girls"	6	3
2022-07-23	J-Hope	"Arson"	1 (Note: Peaked at No. 1 on 2022-97-30 for 1 week)	7
2022-07-23	Mew Suppasit & Bumkey	"Forever Love"	4	14
2022-07-30	Seventeen	"_World"	4	3
2022-07-30	Itzy	"Sneakers"	9	1
2022-07-30	Enhypen	"ParadoXXX Invasion"	4	4
2022-08-06	Twice	"Celebrate"	19	1
2022-08-13	Ateez	"Guerrilla"	2	3
2022-08-13	Benny Blanco, BTS & Snoop Dogg	"Bad Decisions"	4	4
2022-08-20	Girls' Generation	"Forever 1"	5	1 (R) 2
2022-08-27	Blackpink	"Pink Venom"	1 (Total 3 weeks)	7 (R) 8
2022-08-27	Twice	"Talk That Talk"	4	4
2022-09-10	Balming Tiger's Omega Sapien, bj Wnjn & Mudd the Student, feat. RM	"Sexy Nukim"	2	3
2022-09-10	Ive	"After Like"	7	3
2022-09-10	Key	"Gasoline"	17	2
2022-09-17	Blackpink	"Shut Down"	1 (Total 2 weeks) (Note: Peaked at No. 1 on 2022-09-24 for 2 weeks)	6
2022-09-24	NCT 127	"2 Baddies"	5	4
2022-10-01	Crush feat. J-Hope	"Rush Hour"	4	3
2022-10-01	Blackpink	"Hard to Love"	17	1
2022-10-01	Stray Kids	"Case 143"	1 (Total 2 weeks) (Note: Peaked at No. 1 on 2022-10-15 (2 weeks))	4
2022-10-01	Blackpink	"The Happiest Girl"	20	1
2022-10-08	Jun	"Limbo"	16	1
2022-10-08	Xiumin	"Brand New"	11	3
2022-10-15	Treasure	"Hello"	2	2 (R) 4
2022-10-15	Seulgi	"28 Reasons"	14	2
2022-11-05	Jin	"The Astronaut"	3	3
2022-11-12	Jaehyun	"Can't Take My Eyes Off You"	8	1
2022-11-19	B.I	"Endless Summer"	11	1
2022-11-19	B.I	"Tangerine"	8	1 (R) 3
2022-11-19	Up10tion	"Angel"	20	1
2022-11-26	NCT 127	"Gold Dust"	19	1
2022-12-03	Jungkook	"Dreamers"	1	1 (R) 2
2022-12-03	Red Velvet	"Birthday"	2	1
2022-12-03	Bibi	"Bibi Vengeance"	3	1
2022-12-03	Bibi	"Jotto"	5	1
2022-12-03	Girls' Generation	"Lucky Like That"	6	1 (R) 2
2022-12-03	Bibi	"Lowlife Princess"	7	1
2022-12-03	NCT Dream	"Sorry, Heart"	13	1
2022-12-03	Nmixx	"Funky Glitter Christmas"	15	1
2022-12-03	Drippin	"The One"	19	1
2022-12-10	RM with Park Ji-yoon	"No.2"	1	1
2022-12-10	RM with Kim Sa-wol	"Forg_tful"	2	1
2022-12-10	RM	"Lonely"	3	1
2022-12-10	1st.One	"Shout Out"	5	1
2022-12-10	RM with Colde	"Hectic"	7	1
2022-12-10	J-Hope	"Future"	6	1 (R) 2
2022-12-10	Stray Kids	"Venom"	10	1
2022-12-10	RM with Erykah Badu	"Yun"	12	1
2022-12-10	Itzy	"Cheshire	16	1
2022-12-10	RM with Paul Blanco & Mahalia	"Closer"	17	1
2022-12-10	Enhypen	"Walk the Line"	18	1
2022-12-10	Le Sserafim	"The Hydra"	19	1
2022-12-10	TO1	"Drummin'"	20	1
2022-12-17	RM with Anderson .Paak	"Still Life"	9	1
2022-12-31	Stray Kids	"Deep End"	2	1
2022-12-31	NCT Dream	"Take My Breath"	4	1 (R) 2
2022-12-31	NCT Dream	"Walk With You"	5	1 (R) 3
2022-12-31	Stray Kids	"Stars and Raindrops"	6	1
2022-12-31	Stray Kids	"Doodle"	7	1
2022-12-31	Stray Kids	"Ice.Cream"	8	1
2022-12-31	Stray Kids	"Love Untold"	9	1
2022-12-31	Stray Kids	"Up All Night"	10	1
2022-12-31	NCT Dream	"Moon"	11	1
2022-12-31	Stray Kids	"Limbo"	12	1
2022-12-31	NewJeans	"Ditto"	16	1
2022-12-31	NCT Dream	"Candy"	19	1
2022-12-31	J-Hope	"Music Box: Reflection	20	1
2023-01-07	Kim Chaewon	"First Love"	5	1
2023-01-07	Psy	"Celeb"	13	1
2023-01-07	P1Harmony	"Follow Me"	14	1
2023-01-14	Taeyang feat. Jimin	"Vibe"	1	4
2023-01-14	Ateez	"Outro: Blue Bird"	4	1
2023-01-14	Nayeon	"Sunset"	5	1
2023-01-14	Ateez	"I'm the One"	6	1
2023-01-14	NewJeans	"OMG"	11	1
2023-01-14	NCT 127	"Playback"	12	1
2023-01-14	Got the Beat	"Stamp On It"	13	1
2023-01-14	Blackpink	"Ddu-Du Ddu-Du"	17	1
2023-01-21	Monsta X	"Deny"	1	1
2023-01-21	Huh Yun-jin (Le Sserafim)	"I =/= DOLL"	2	1
2023-01-21	Monsta X	"Crescendo"	5	1
2023-01-21	Monsta X	"Lone Ranger"	6	1
2023-01-21	Monsta X	"Daydream"	7	1
2023-01-21	Monsta X	"It's Alright"	9	1
2023-01-21	Nayeon	"Candyfloss"	15	1
2023-01-28	Stray Kids	"The Sound"	1	1
2023-01-28	Stray Kids	"DLMLU"	2	1
2023-01-28	Stray Kids	"Novel"	3	1
2023-01-28	Stray Kids	"Battle Ground"	4	1 (R) 2
2023-01-28	Stray Kids	"Lost Me"	5	1 (R) 2
2023-01-28	AleXa	"Endorphine"	13	
2023-02-11	TXT	"Tinnitus (Wanna Be a Rock)"	1	1
2023-02-11	TXT	"Devil by the Window"	3	1
2023-02-11	TXT	"Happy Fools"	5	1
2023-02-11	TXT	"Farewell, Neverland"	7	1
2023-02-11	(G)I-dle	"Reset"	8	1
2023-02-11	Viviz	"Pull Up"	10	1
2023-02-11	TXT	"Sugar Rush Ride"	15	1
2023-02-18	BSS feat. Peder Elias	"7PM"	5	1
2023-02-18	BSS feat. Lee Young-ji	"Fighting"	11	1
2023-02-18	BSS	"Lunch"	14	1
2023-02-18	BTS	"Attack On Bangtan"	15	1
2023-02-25	Rosé	"Until I Found You" cover	1	1
2023-02-25	Wheein	"Make Me Happy"	7	1
2023-03-11	J-Hope with J. Cole	"On the Street"	9	2
2023-03-11	Twice	"Wallflower"	16	1
2023-03-18	Onew	"Rain On Me"	4	1
2023-03-18	Onew feat. Giriboy	"Caramel"	13	1
2023-03-25	Nmixx	"Young, Dumb, Stupid"	1	1
2023-03-25	Jimin	"Set Me Free Pt. 2"	4	3
2023-03-25	Jisoo	Me	7	1
2023-03-25	NCT U	"New Axis"	8	1
2023-03-25	Seulgi	"Los Angeles"	14	1
2023-03-25	Kai	"Rover"	15	1 (R) 2
2023-03-25	So!YoON!	"Canada"	18	1
2023-03-25	So!YoON! feat. RM	"Smoke Sprite"	19	1
2023-04-01	Ive	"Kitsch"	9	2
2023-04-01	Jimin	"Like Crazy"	3	6
2023-04-01	Nmixx	"Love Me Like This"	13	1
2023-04-08	Jisoo	"All Eyes on Me"	4	2
2023-04-15	Agust D feat. IU	"People Pt. 2"	6	1
2023-04-15	Jisoo	"Flower"	9	2
2023-04-22	Agust D	"Haegeum"	1	3
2023-04-22	Taeyeon	"Toddler"	2	1
2023-04-22	Agust D	"Amygdala"	3	1
2023-04-22	Agust D	"Snooze"	9	1
2023-04-22	Taeyeon	"Set Myself on Fire"	12	1
2023-04-22	Agust D	"D-Day"	12	3
2023-04-29	Stray Kids	"Time Out"	3	1
2023-04-29	Yeri feat. Sam Kim	"Nap Fairy"	17	1 (R) 2
2023-05-06	Seventeen	"I Don't Understand but I Luv U"	1	1
2023-05-06	iKon	"Tantara"	4	1
2023-05-06	Seventeen	"Dust"	5	1
2023-05-06	Taeyang feat. Beenzino	"Inspiration"	6	1
2023-05-06	Taeyang	"Reason"	7	1
2023-05-06	BabyMonster	"HARAM" (name of group member)	8	1
2023-05-06	Seventeen	"April Shower"	9	1
2023-05-06	Seventeen	"Super"	10	2
2023-05-06	Taeyang feat. Bryan Chase	"Nightfall"	13	1
2023-05-06	Seventeen	"Fire"	15	1
2023-05-06	Agust D	"SDL"	16	1
2023-05-06	Agust D	"Interlude: Dawn"	19	1
2023-05-13	Colde feat. RM	"Don't Ever Say Love Me"	1	1
2023-05-13	Aespa	"Thirsty"	6	1
2023-05-13	Le Sserafim	"No-Return (Into the Unknown)"	7	1
2023-05-13	Aespa	"Salty & Sweet"	10	1
2023-05-13	Le Sserafim	"Flash Forward"	15	1
2023-05-13	Mamamoo	"L.I.E.C."	17	1
2023-05-13	(G)I-dle	"Sculpture"	18	1
2023-05-20	(G)I-dle	"Allergy"	2	1
2023-05-20	Stray Kids	"FNF"	3	1
2023-05-20	Stray Kids	"Collision"	5	1
2023-05-20	CL	"Tie a Cherry"	10	1
2023-05-20	Aespa	"Spicy"	13	2
2023-05-20	Oneus	"Erase Me"	17	1
2023-05-27	BabyMonster	"Dream"	1	1
2023-05-27	Danielle (NewJeans)	"Part of Your World (Korean version)	2	1
2023-05-27	Taeyong	"Shalala"	3	2 (R) 3
2023-05-27	Kodak Black & NLE Choppa feat. Jimin, Jvke, Muni Long	"Angel Pt. 1"	12	1
2023-05-27	Stray Kids	"Streetlight"	13	1
2023-05-27	Seventeen	"Bout You"	15	1
2023-06-03	Le Sserafim	"Eve, Psyche & the Bluebeard's Wife"	1	1
2023-06-10	BTS	"Take Two"	1	4
2023-06-10	Stray Kids	"Youtiful"	3	1
2023-06-10	NCT Dream	"Rewind"	5	1
2023-06-10	Stray Kids	"S-Class"	16	1
2023-06-10	J-Hope	"Pandora's Box"	17	1
2023-06-10	NCT Dream	"Fire Alarm"	18	1
2023-06-10	TXT & Iann Dior	"Valley of Lies"	19	1
2023-06-17	Shinee	"The Feeling"	2	1
2023-06-17	Fromis 9	"Attitude"	6	1
2023-06-17	Enhypen	"Interlude: Question"	12	1
2023-06-17	So!YoON!	"Till The Sun Goes Up"	19	1
2023-06-17	So!YoON! feat. Jibin	"Gave You All My Love"	20	1
2023-06-24	Exo	"Let Me In"	1	1
2023-06-24	Exo	"Hear Me Out"	4	1
2023-07-01	The Weeknd, Jennie & Lily-Rose Depp	"One of the Girls"	1	1
2023-07-01	NCT Dream	"Best Friend Ever"	7	1
2023-07-01	NCT Dream	"It's Yours"	5	1 (R) 2
2023-07-01	NCT Dream	"Tangerine Love (Favorite)"	12	1
2023-07-01	TXT & Jonas Brothers	"Do It Like That"	13	1
2023-07-01	Ateez	"Bouncy (K-Hot Chilli Peppers)"	18	1
2023-07-15	Exo	"Cream Soda"	1	2
2023-07-15	Exo	"Love Fool"	2	1
2023-07-15	Exo	"No Makeup"	3	1
2023-07-15	Exo	"Private Party"	4	1
2023-07-15	Exo	"Regret"	6	1
2023-07-15	Jungkook	"Seven"	3	4 (R) 6
2023-07-15	Exo	"Another Day"	11	1
2023-07-15	Nmixx	"Roller Coaster"	12	1
2023-07-15	Exo	"Cinderella"	13	1
2023-07-15	Fromis 9	"Wishlist"	18	1
2023-07-15	NCT 127	"Black Clouds"	19	1
2023-07-22	Nmixx	"Party O'Clock"	4	1
2023-07-22	Chung Ha	"Sparkling"	16	1
2023-07-29	NCT Dream	"Blue Wave"	1	1
2023-07-29	NewJeans	"Cool with You"	4	1
2023-07-29	NCT Dream	"Like We Just Met"	5	1
2023-07-29	NCT Dream	"Pretzel"	7	1
2023-07-29	NCT Dream	"Yogurt Shake"	9	1
2023-07-29	Girls' Generation	"Paper Plane"	10	1
2023-07-29	NCT Dream	"Skateboard"	11	1
2023-07-29	NCT Dream	"Poison"	15	1
2023-07-29	NCT Dream	"Starry Night"	17	1
2023-07-29	NCT Dream	"ISTJ"	20	1
2023-08-05	Shownu x Hyungwon	"Love Therapy"	7	1
2023-08-05	Shownu x Hyungwon	"Play Me"	10	1
2023-08-05	Shownu x Hyungwon	"Slow Dance"	14	1
2023-08-05	S.E.S	"Dreams Come True"	20	1
2023-08-12	Treasure	"B.O.M.B"	1	1
2023-08-19	V	"Love Me Again"	1	1
2023-08-19	V	"Rainy Days"	2	1
2023-08-19	Riize	"Siren"	3	1
2023-08-19	V	"Slow Dancing"	7	3
2023-08-19	The Boyz	"Lip Gloss"	16	1
2023-08-26	Jihyo feat. 24kGoldn	"Talkin' About It"	8	1
2023-08-26	Ateez	"Where Do I Go"	9	1
2023-08-26	Jihyo	"Close"	11	1
2023-08-26	Jihyo	"Wishing On You"	15	1
2023-08-26	Everglow	"Slay"	17	1
2023-08-26	Stray Kids	"Hug Me"	18	1
2023-08-26	STAYC	"Bubble"	19	1
2023-09-02	V	"Blue"	15	1
2023-09-09	NCT U	"Baggy Jeans"	1	1
2023-09-09	NCT U	"Alley Oop"	3	1
2023-09-09	NCT U	"Kangaroo"	4	1
2023-09-09	NCT U	"The Bat"	6	1
2023-09-09	NCT U	"Pado"	7	1
2023-09-09	NCT 2023	"Goden Age"	13	1
2023-09-16	BoyNextDoor	"But Sometimes"	5	1
2023-09-16	Up10tion	"Bloom"	15	1
2023-09-23	Cravity	"Ready Or Not"	1	1
2023-09-23	DPR Ian	"So I Danced"	14	1
2023-09-23	Stray Kids	"Fam"	17	1
2023-09-30	Evnne	"Trouble"	2	1
2023-09-30	Vcha	"Y.O.Universe"	5	1
2023-09-30	Nayeon	"No Problem"	6	1
2023-09-30	P1Harmony	"More Than Words"	7	1

=== Kid Digital Song Sales ===
- Chart discontinued after 2020-01-18
2018-07-21 – 2020-01-18

Chart date	Artist	Song/Album title	Peak position	Weeks on chart
2018-07-21	Pinkfong	"Baby Shark"	1 (Note: Peaked at No. 1 on 2018-09-15 for 3 weeks, returned to No. 1 on 2018-10-13 for 8 weeks, returned to No. 1 on 2019-01-19 for 9 weeks, returned to No. 1 on 2019-09-21 for 1 week, returned to No. 1 on 2019-10-19 for 1 week, returned to No. 1 on 2019-11-09 for 1 week))	1 (R) 74

=== Latin Airplay ===
- Chart started 2012-10-20

Chart date	Artist	Song/Album title	Peak position	Weeks on chart
2022-02-19	DJ Snake, Ozuna, Megan Thee Stallion & Lisa	"SG"	1 (Note: 2022-04-02 (1 week))	10
2025-02-15	Rosé & Bruno Mars	"Apt."	45	2 (R) 6
2026-04-04	BTS	"Swim"	27	4

=== Latin Digital Song Sales (Complete) ===
- Chart started 2010-01-23 and discontinued after 2026-06-27
2018-04-28 – 2026-06-27

Chart date	Artist	Song/Album title	Peak position	Weeks on chart
2018-04-28	Super Junior feat. Leslie Grace & Play-N-Skillz	"Lo Siento"	13	1
2018-10-20	Super Junior & Reik	"One More Time (Otra Vez)"	18	1
2021-11-06	DJ Snake, Ozuna, Megan Thee Stallion & Lisa	"SG"	1	2

=== Latin Pop Digital Song Sales ===
- Chart started 2010-01-23 and discontinued after 2026-06-27
2018-10-20 – 2026-06-27

Chart date	Artist	Song/Album title	Peak position	Weeks on chart
2018-10-20	Super Junior & Reik	"One More Time (Otra Vez)"	5	2

=== Latin Rhythm Airplay ===
- Chart started 2005-08-13

Chart date	Artist	Song/Album title	Peak position	Weeks on chart
2021-12-11	DJ Snake, Ozuna, Megan Thee Stallion & Lisa	"SG"	1	18

=== LyricFind Global ===
- Chart started 2015-11-07

Chart date	Artist	Song/Album title	Peak position	Weeks on chart
2018-09-15	BTS	"Fake Love"	6	1 (R) 2
2018-10-20	Pinkfong	"Baby Shark"	1 (Note: 2018-10-27 (1 week))	2 (R) 3
2018-11-10	Steve Aoki feat. BTS	"Waste It on Me"	17	1
2018-11-10	Dua Lipa & Blackpink	"Kiss and Make Up"	18	1
2019-04-20	Blackpink	"Kill This Love"	9	1
2019-04-27	BTS	"Boy in Luv"	11	1
2019-05-04	BTS	"Dionysus"	17	1
2019-05-04	BTS	"Make It Right"	18	1
2019-05-04	BTS feat. Halsey	"Boy with Luv"	2	1
2019-05-04	BTS	"Jamais Vu"	22	1
2020-03-07	BTS	"We Are Bulletproof: The Eternal"	7	1
2020-03-07	BTS	"Louder Than Bombs"	11	1
2020-05-30	Stray Kids	"Top"	18	1
2020-05-30	Stray Kids	"Slump"	25	2
2020-06-13	Lady Gaga and Blackpink	"Sour Candy"	1	1 (R) 3
2020-07-04	BTS	"Stay Gold"	9	1
2020-07-04	Blackpink	"How You Like That"	1 (Note: 2020-07-25 (1 week))	4
2020-07-25	BTS	"Your Eyes Tell"	21	1
2020-09-05	Blackpink and Selena Gomez	"Ice Cream"	8	2
2020-09-12	BTS	"Dynamite"	7	2 (R) 8
2020-10-24	Blackpink	"Love to Hate Me"	20	2
2020-10-31	Blackpink	"Lovesick Girls"	15	1
2020-11-07	Monsta X	"You Can't Hold My Heart"	2	1
2020-11-07	Twice	"I Can't Stop Me"	7	1 (R) 7
2020-11-28	Aespa	"Black Mamba"	19	1
2020-12-05	BTS	"Life Goes On"	16	1
2020-12-12	Chungha with R3hab	"Dream of You"	9	1
2020-12-12	Got7	"Breath"	24	1
2020-12-12	Enhypen	"Let Me In (20 CUBE)"	25	1
2020-12-19	Red Velvet	"Umpah Umpah"	3	1
2021-02-06	IU	"Celebrity"	21	1
2021-02-13	Everglow	"La Di Da"	13	1
2021-03-13	Kang Daniel	"Paranoia"	7	1
2021-03-13	NU'EST with Spoonz	"Let's Love"	21	1
2021-03-13	NCT 127	"Kick It"	24	1
2021-03-13	Hwasa	"Maria"	25	1
2021-03-20	Wonho	"Open Mind"	24	1
2021-03-20	GFriend	"Mago"	25	1
2021-03-27	Rosé	"On the Ground"	12	1 (R) 2
2021-03-27	iKon	"Why Why Why"	20	1
2021-04-10	Wonho	"Losing You"	25	1
2021-04-17	Astro	"One"	21	1
2021-04-17	Baekhyun	"Bambi"	22	1
2021-04-24	BTS	"Film Out"	11	2
2021-04-24	AB6IX	"Salute"	19	1
2021-04-24	Shinee	"Atlantis"	20	1
2021-04-24	Treasure	"I Love You"	22	1
2021-04-24	Blackpink	"Ddu-Du Ddu-Du"	24	1
2021-04-24	SuperM	"We Do"	25	1
2021-05-01	Dreamcatcher	"Odd Eye"	20	1
2021-05-01	NU'EST	"Inside Out"	21	1
2021-05-08	Itzy	"In the Morning"	13	1
2021-05-22	Enhypen	"Drunk-Dazed"	9	1
2021-05-22	NCT Dream	"Hot Sauce"	11	1 (R) 2
2021-05-29	BTS	"Butter"	5	1 (R) 5
2021-06-12	AleXa	"Do or Die"	15	1
2021-06-12	Everglow	"First"	25	1
2021-06-19	Taemin	"Advice"	11	1
2021-06-19	Exo	"Don't Fight the Feeling"	18	1
2021-06-19	Aespa	"Next Level"	22	1 (R) 2
2021-07-03	Brave Girls	"Chi Mat Ba Ram"	11	1
2021-07-10	2PM	"Make It"	15	1
2021-07-17	Loona	"PTT (Paint the Town)"	8	1
2021-07-17	BTS	"Permission to Dance"	2	2
2021-07-24	SF9	"Tear Drop"	15	1
2021-08-07	D.O.	"Rose"	14	1
2021-08-07	AKMU with IU	"Nakka"	19	1
2021-08-14	Sam Kim	"Love Me Like That"	7	1 (R) 2
2021-08-14	Somi	"Dumb Dumb"	14	1
2021-08-14	Jo Jung-suk	"I Like You"	24	1
2021-08-28	Red Velvet	"Queendom"	5	1
2021-09-25	Fromis 9	"Talk & Talk"	9	1
2021-09-25	Lisa	"Lalisa"	14	2 (R) 3
2021-09-25	Wonho	"Blue"	23	1
2021-10-02	Ateez	"Deja Vu"	12	1
2021-10-02	Mamamoo	"Mumumumuch"	20	1
2021-10-09	Itzy	"Loco"	7	1 (R) 2
2021-11-06	Golden Child	"Ra Pam Pam"	7	1
2021-11-20	Coldplay & BTS	"My Universe"	11	1 (R) 8
2022-01-15	Somi	"Anymore"	7	1
2022-01-29	Enhypen	"Blessed-Cursed"	15	2
2022-04-30	Dreamcatcher	"Maison"	20	1
2022-04-30	Jay Park feat. IU	"Ganadara"	23	1
2022-05-14	Psy feat. Suga	"That That"	9	2
2022-05-21	Le Sserafim	"Fearless"	5	1
2022-05-21	Ha Sung-woon & Jimin	"With You"	14	1
2022-05-21	TXT	"Good Boy Gone Bad"	16	1
2022-06-11	Seventeen	"Hot"	25	1
2022-06-25	BTS	"Yet to Come"	16	1
2022-07-02	Charlie Puth feat. Jungkook	"Left and Right"	6	1
2022-07-02	Wonho	"Crazy"	21	1
2022-07-09	Nayeon	"Pop!"	15	1
2022-07-23	Aespa	"Girls"	10	1 (R) 2
2022-07-30	Itzy	"Sneakers"	5	1 (R) 4
2022-07-30	Super Junior	"Mango"	18	1
2022-08-06	STAYC	"Beautiful Monster"	18	1
2022-08-06	Monsta X & Sam Feldt	"Late Night Feels"	22	1
2022-08-13	Girls' Generation	"Forever 1"	13	2 (R) 3
2022-08-13	Stray Kids	"Mixtape: Time Out"	24	1
2022-08-20	Benny Blanco, BTS & Snoop Dogg	"Bad Decisions"	10	1
2022-09-03	Ive	"After Like"	12	1
2022-09-03	Blackpink	"Pink Venom"	13	1 (R) 3
2022-09-10	Twice	"Talk That Talk"	9	1
2022-09-24	Blackpink	"Shut Down"	7	2
2022-10-01	Nmixx	"Dice"	13	1
2022-10-22	Stray Kids	"Case 143"	21	1
2022-11-05	Christopher & Chungha	"When I Get Old"	18	1
2022-12-03	Victon	"Virus"	23	1
2022-12-10	Itzy	"Cheshire	23	2
2022-12-31	NewJeans	"Ditto"	7	1
2022-12-31	Super Junior	"Celebrate"	16	1
2022-12-31	Seventeen	"Darl+ing"	7	1 (R) 4
2023-01-21	Jungkook	"Dreamers"	15	1
2023-01-28	Taeyang feat. Jimin	"Vibe"	16	1
2023-02-04	Twice	"Moonlight Sunrise"	9	1 (R) 5
2023-02-11	Got the Beat	"Stamp on It"	15	1
2023-02-11	TXT	"Sugar Rush Ride"	19	1
2023-02-11	NewJeans	"OMG"	14	1 (R) 3
2023-03-04	Jessi	"Zoom"	13	1
2023-03-18	Twice	"Set Me Free"	9	2 (R) 8
2023-04-08	Ive	"Kitsch"	13	1 (R) 2
2023-04-15	Jisoo	"Flower"	7	1
2023-04-22	Apink	"D N D"	7	1 (R) 2
2023-04-29	Billlie	"Eunoia"	6	1
2023-04-29	Chaeyeon	"Knock"	11	1
2023-04-29	Itzy	"Boys Like You"	17	1
2023-05-13	Le Sserafim feat. Nile Rodgers	"Unforgiven"	21	1
2023-05-20	Jimin	"Like Crazy"	11	1
2023-05-20	Aespa	"Spicy"	14	1 (R) 2
2023-05-20	Fifty Fifty	"Cupid"	3	1 (R) 23
2023-06-03	(G)I-dle	"Queencard"	22	1
2023-06-10	Enhypen	"Bite Me"	14	1
2023-06-10	Dreamcatcher	"Bonvoyage"	25	1
2023-06-24	BTS	"Take Two"	9	1 (R) 2
2023-06-24	P1Harmony	"Jump"	25	1
2023-07-01	NCT Dream	"Broken Melodies"	8	1 (R) 2
2023-07-01	Ateez	"Bouncy (K-Hot Chilli Peppers)"	20	1
2023-07-08	Kodak Black & NLE Choppa feat. Jimin, Jvke, Muni Long	"Angel Pt. 1"	15	1
2023-07-22	NewJeans	"Super Shy"	11	1 (R) 3
2023-07-22	Exo	"Cream Soda"	20	1
2023-08-12	Treasure	"Bona Bona"	15	1 (R) 2
2023-08-19	Somi	"Fast Forward"	21	1
2023-09-02	Jihyo	"Killin' Me Good"	14	1
2023-09-09	Somi	"Gold Gold Gold"	16	1 (R) 2
2023-09-23	V	"Slow Dancing"	14	1
2023-09-23	D.O.	"I Do"	16	1
2023-09-30	TXT & Anitta	"Back For More"	6	1 (R) 2
2023-10-07	Ive	"Either Way"	5	1
2023-10-07	Kep1er	"Galileo"	12	1
2023-11-04	Jennie	"You & Me"	5	2
2023-11-04	Seventeen	"God of Music"	9	2
2023-11-04	Treasure	"B.O.M.B"	11	1
2023-11-04	Sunmi	"Stranger"	12	1
2023-11-04	Ive	"Baddie"	9	3 (R) 4
2023-11-04	Oneus	"Baila Conmigo"	17	1
2023-11-11	Jessi	"Gum"	6	1
2023-11-11	Le Sserafim	"Perfect Night"	7	1
2023-11-11	Riize	"Talk Saxy"	8	1 (R) 2
2023-11-18	Jungkook	"Standing Next to You"	7	1 (R) 4
2023-11-18	Zerobaseone	"Crush"	12	1
2023-11-18	Viviz	"Maniac"	19	1
2023-11-25	Stray Kids	"Lalalala"	4	1 (R) 2
2023-11-25	Aespa	"Drama"	6	2
2023-11-25	Itzy	"None of My Business"	13	1
2023-11-25	Enhypen	"Sweet Venom"	4	2
2023-11-25	Riize	"Get a Guitar"	11	1 (R) 3
2023-10-25	Jungkook feat. Latto	"Seven"	3	1 (R) 14
2023-12-09	BabyMonster	"Batter Up"	1	1
2023-12-09	Aespa	"Jingle Bell Rock"	2	2
2023-12-23	Aespa	"Better Things"	3	1 (R) 3
2024-01-06	Aespa	"Life's Too Short"	6	1 (R) 2
2024-01-13	NCT U	"Baggy Jeans"	14	1 (R) 2
2024-01-20	Tempest	"Bad News"	5	1
2024-01-20	The Boyz	"Roar"	6	1
2024-01-20	Blackpink	"Typa Girl"	8	1
2024-01-20	Chungha	"Sparkling"	9	1
2024-01-27	Yeo-sang, San & Woo-young (Ateez)	"It's You"	3	1
2024-02-10	(G)I-dle	"Super Lady"	2	1
2024-02-10	BabyMonster	"Stuck in the Middle"	8	2 (R) 4
2024-02-17	Twice	"I Got You"	4	1 (R) 2
2024-03-02	IU	"Holssi"	3	1
2024-03-02	Moonbyul	"Touchin&Movin"	7	1
2024-03-02	Max & Huh Yunjin	"Stupid in Love"	23	1
2024-03-09	Twice	"One Spark"	3	1 (R) 2
2024-03-09	Le Sserafim	"Easy"	5	1 (R) 3
2024-03-09	Ive	"Eleven"	12	1
2024-03-16	NewJeans	"Cool with You"	12	1
2024-03-23	Le Sserafim	"Smart"	6	1
2024-04-06	Illit	"Magnetic"	2	1 (R) 4
2024-04-06	Wendy	"Wish You Hell"	7	1
2024-05-25	Stray Kids feat. Charlie Puth	"Lose My Breath"	5	1
2024-05-25	Aespa	"Supernova"	9	1 (R) 2
2024-05-25	BabyMonster	"Sheesh"	10	1 (R) 4
2024-05-25	Seventeen	"Maestro"	4	1 (R) 2
2024-06-08	NewJeans	"How Sweet"	6	1
2024-06-15	Zico feat. Jennie	"Spot!"	17	2
2024-06-15	Jungkook & Major Lazer	"Closer to You"	19	1
2024-06-22	Peggy Gou	"(It Goes Like) Nanana"	23	1
2024-07-27	Enhypen	"XO (Only If You Say Yes)"	3	1
2024-07-27	Lay Zhang	"Psychic"	9	1
2024-07-27	STAYC	"Cheeky Icy Thang"	10	1
2024-07-27	Dreamcatcher	"Justice"	14	1
2024-08-03	Itzy	"Trust Me (Midzy)"	4	2
2024-08-10	Stray Kids feat. Bang Chan & Changbin	"Maknae on Top"	20	1
2024-08-17	Nowadays	"Rainy Day" (2024 Remake version)	7	2
2024-08-17	YdBB feat. Ha Hyun-sang	"Runaway"	20	1
2024-08-24	Stray Kids	"Jjam"	14	1
2024-09-07	Ive	"Accendio"	13	2
2024-09-07	Zerobaseone	"Good So Bad"	14	1
2024-09-07	Jun. K	"Paint This Love"	15	1
2024-09-14	Park Eun-bin	"Night and DAy"	4	1
2024-09-21	Meovv	"Meow"	11	1 (R) 2
2024-09-21	Seventeen	"Cheers"	14	1 (R) 2
2024-09-28	Le Sserafim	"1-800-Hot-N-Fun"	25	1
2024-10-05	Fifty Fifty	"SOS"	21	1
2024-10-05	NewJeans	"Right Now"	22	1
2024-10-12	Twice	"Hello"	9	1
2024-10-26	Jennie	"Mantra"	12	1 (R) 2
2024-10-26	Baekhyun	"Pineapple Slice"	22	1
2024-11-02	Rosé & Bruno Mars	"Apt."	3	2 (R) 13
2024-11-09	Illit	"Cherish (My Love)"	13	1
2024-11-09	BTS & Charli XCX	"Dream Glow"	4	3
2024-11-16	TXT	"Chasing That Feeling"	19	1
2024-12-07	G-Dragon feat. Taeyang & Daesung	"Home Sweet Home"	18	1
2024-12-14	Rosé	"Number One Girl"	25	1
2024-12-21	Treasure	"Last Night"	8	1 (R) 2
2024-12-21	Ateez	"Ice on My Teeth"	10	1
2024-12-28	Stray Kids, Young Miko & Tom Morello	"Come Play"	22	1
2025-01-18	Babymonster	"Drip"	21	1
2025-02-15	Rosé	"Toxic Till the End"	21	1 (R) 3
2025-02-22	Lisa feat. Doja Cat & Raye	"Born Again"	10	1
2025-02-22	The Weeknd, Jennie & Lily-Rose Depp	"One of the Girls"	16	1
2025-02-22	Ive	"Attitude"	23	1
2025-03-01	Jisoo	"Earthquake"	20	1
2025-03-01	Lisa	"Moonlit Floor (Kiss Me)"	25	1
2025-03-15	Jennie feat. Dominic Fike	"Love Hangover"	23	1
2025-03-22	Jennie	"Like Jennie"	6	2
2025-03-22	Jennie, Childish Gambino & Kali Uchis	"Damn Right"	19	1
2025-03-29	Le Sserafim	"Hot"	2	1 (R) 2
2025-03-29	Hearts2Hearts	"The Chase"	9	1
2025-03-29	Nmixx	"Know About Me"	10	1
2025-03-29	Suzy	"Waiting on a Wish"	14	1
2025-03-29	BSS	"CBZ (Prime Time)"	15	1
2025-03-29	The Boyz	"VVV"	18	1
2025-04-12	Illit	"Almond Chocolate"	9	1
2025-04-12	Nmixx	"High Horse"	25	1
2025-04-19	Jennie	"Seoul City"	13	1
2025-05-03	Kim Jung Mi	"Bom"	18	1
2025-05-17	Maroon 5 feat. Lisa	"Priceless"	9	1
2025-06-28	STAYC	"GPT"	6	1 (R) 3
2025-06-28	Bibi	"Apocalypse"	9	1
2025-06-28	Ateez	"Lemon Drop"	11	1 (R) 2
2025-06-28	Kai	"Wait on Me"	13	1
2025-06-28	BoyNextDoor	"I Feel Good"	9	1 (R) 3
2025-06-28	Enhypen	"Bad Desire (With or Without You)"	10	1 (R) 3
2025-06-28	J-Hope & GloRilla	"Killin' It Girl"	15	2
2025-06-28	Meovv	"Meovv"	7	1 (R) 3
2025-06-28	NewJeans	"Hurt"	25	1
2025-07-12	Huntrix, Ejae, Audrey Nuna & Rei Ami	"Golden"	1 (Total 5 weeks) (Note: Peaked at No. 1 on 2025-09-06 (1 week), 2025-11-15 (2 weeks), 2026-03-07 (1 week), 2026-04-11 (1 week))	1 (R) 36
2025-07-12	Saja Boys, Andrew Choi, Neckwav, Danny Chung, Kevin Woo & samUIL Lee	"Your Idol"	3	4 (R) 23
2025-07-12	Huntrix, Ejae, Audrey Nuna & Rei Ami	"What It Sounds Like"	6	1 (R) 3
2025-07-12	Saja Boys, Andrew Choi, Neckwav, Danny Chung, Kevin Woo & samUIL Lee	"Soda Pop"	3	4 (R) 19
2025-07-12	Huntrix, Ejae, Audrey Nuna & Rei Ami	"How It's Done"	2	2 (R) 9
2025-07-12	Huntrix, Ejae, Audrey Nuna & Rei Ami	"Takedown"	6	1 (R) 8
2025-07-12	AllDay Project	"Famous"	18	1 (R) 2
2025-07-19	Blackpink	"Jump"	15	1
2025-09-06	BoA	"Crazier"	17	1
2025-09-06	Aespa	"Whiplash"	18	1
2025-10-11	Ive	"XOXZ"	1	1
2025-10-11	Stray Kids	"Ceremony"	6	1 (R) 2
2025-10-11	Babymonster	"Hot Sauce"	5	1 (R) 4
2025-10-11	Cortis	"Go!"	3	1 (R) 5
2025-10-18	Plave	"Hide and Seek"	4	1
2025-10-18	P1Harmony	"Ex"	7	1
2025-11-01	Tame Impala & Jennie	"Dracula" remix	2	1 (R) 28
2025-11-01	Huntrix, Azul Botticher, Karin Zavala & Tatul Bernodat	"Dorada" ("Golden" Spanish version)	14	1
2025-11-15	Twice's Jeongyeon, Jihyo & Chaeyoung	"Takedown"	8	2 (R) 4
2025-11-22	TripleS	"Are You Alive"	13	1
2025-11-22	Babymonster	"We Go Up"	18	1
2026-01-17	Jisoo & Zayn Malik	"Eyes Closed"	4	2
2026-01-17	STAYC	"I Want It"	9	1 (R) 4
2026-01-17	CNBLUE	"Killer Joy"	13	1
2026-01-17	Kim Nam-joo	"Bad"	20	1
2026-01-17	IU feat. Balming Tiger	"A Beautiful Person"	22	1
2026-01-17	BoyNextDoor	"Hollywood Action"	8	1 (R) 2
2026-01-17	AB6IX	"Stupid"	15	1 (R) 2
2026-01-24	Meovv	"Burning Up"	9	1
2026-01-24	AllDay Project	"Look at Me"	12	1
2026-01-24	Wonho	"If You Wanna"	15	1
2026-01-24	Day6	"Maybe Tomorrow"	20	1
2026-01-31	Enhypen	"Knife"	1	1 (R) 2
2026-01-31	Chaeyoung	"Shoot (Firecracker)"	5	1 (R) 2
2026-01-31	AllDayProject	"One More Time"	14	1
2026-01-31	Hwasa	"Good Goodbye"	21	1
2026-02-07	NCT Wish	"Color"	4	1
2026-02-07	Seventeen	"Thunder"	5	1
2026-02-07	Doyoung	"I Find You"	6	1
2026-02-07	Kiiras	"Kill Ma Bo$$"	7	1
2026-02-07	Unis	"Swicy"	7	1 (R) 2
2026-02-07	Baby Dont Cry	"I Dont Care"	10	1
2026-02-07	Enhypen	"Loose"	11	1 (R) 3
2026-02-07	Wendy	"Daydream"	13	1 (R) 2
2026-02-07	Aespa	"Aespa"	16	1
2026-02-07	Apink	"Love Me More"	18	1
2026-02-14	Stray Kids	"Do It"	6	1 (R) 4
2026-02-14	Lisa	"Rockstar"	9	1 (R) 3
2026-02-14	Cortis	"Fashion"	14	1
2026-02-21	IU	"Never Ending Story"	1	1
2026-02-28	Infinite	"Dangerous"	2	1
2026-02-28	Stray Kids	"Bleep"	8	1
2026-03-07	STAYC	"Stereotype"	6	1
2026-03-07	AllDay Project	"Wicked"	8	1
2026-03-07	Nmixx	"Spinnin' On It"	17	1
2026-03-07	Treasure	"Paradise"	24	1
2026-03-21	Blackpink	"Go"	4	1
2026-03-21	Jennie feat. Doechii	"ExtraL"	15	1
2026-03-21	BoyNextDoor	"But I Like You"	17	1
2026-03-21	Hanroro	"0+0"	23	1
2026-03-28	Illit	"Sunday Morning"	20	1
2026-04-04	BTS	"Swim"	2	1 (R) 12
2026-04-04	BTS	"Body to Body"	20	1 (R) 2
2026-04-18	Plave	"Bbuu!"	4	1
2026-04-18	Seventeen (BSS)	"CBZ (Prime Time)"	6	1
2026-05-09	Illit & Sophie Powers	"Jellyous"	6	1 (R) 4
2026-06-06	Miyeon	"Say My Name"	7	1
2026-06-13	Illit	"It's Me"	8	1 (R) 10
2026-06-20	Le Sserafim	"Boompala"	4	1 (R) 4
2026-06-20	Lisa & Anitta & Rema	"Goals"	18	1
2026-06-20	Babymonster	"Choom"	23	1
2026-07-11	Hearts2Hearts	"Focus"	23	1
2026-08-01	Taeyeon	"Bansanka" (Korean remake)	2	1
2026-08-01	Izna	"Sign"	14	1 (R) 2
2026-08-01	Cortis	"RedRed"	16	1
2026-08-22	Le Sserafim, Illit & Katseye	"Iconic by Mistake"	7	6 (R) 7
2026-08-22	Le Sserafim	"Come Over"	18	1 (R) 3
2026-10-10	Jennie	"Fallen Angel"	1	1
2026-10-10	Cortis	"What You Want"	3	1
2026-10-10	Izna	"Metronome"	10	1
2026-10-10	Stray Kids	"This & That"	17	1
2026-10-10	Jisoo	"Click"	19	1
2026-10-17	Stray Kids	"I Like It"	22	1
2026-10-24	Hearts2Hearts	"Iconic Heart"	9	2
2026-10-31	Ive	"Looks Can Kill"	11	1
2026-10-31	BTS	"2.0"	17	1
2026-10-31	Yuna	"Ice Cream"	21	1
2026-11-14	Lisa	"Sawadika"	16	1

=== LyricFind U.S. ===
- Chart started 2015-11-07

Chart date	Artist	Song/Album title	Peak position	Weeks on chart
2018-09-15	BTS	"Fake Love"	11	1 (R) 2
2018-11-10	Dua Lipa & Blackpink	"Kiss and Make Up"	19	1
2019-04-20	Blackpink	"Kill This Love"	11	1
2019-04-27	BTS	"Boy in Luv"	17	1
2019-05-04	BTS feat. Halsey	"Boy with Luv"	1	2 (R) 3
2019-07-20	BTS	"Mikrokosmos"	25	1
2019-08-31	Pinkfong	"Baby Shark"	2	1 (R) 2
2020-03-07	BTS	"We Are Bulletproof: The Eternal"	3	2
2020-03-07	BTS	"Louder Than Bombs"	4	2
2020-03-14	BTS	"Filter" (Jimin solo)	14	1
2020-05-30	Stray Kids	"Top"	5	2
2020-05-30	Stray Kids	"Slump"	11	2
2020-06-20	Lady Gaga and Blackpink	"Sour Candy"	21	1
2020-08-29	Baekhyun	"Underwater"	13	1
2020-09-05	BTS	"Dynamite"	2	3 (R) 6
2020-09-12	Blackpink and Selena Gomez	"Ice Cream"	6	1
2020-09-26	Seventeen	"Home"	22	1
2020-10-24	Blackpink	"Love to Hate Me"	13	1
2020-10-24	Blackpink	"Lovesick Girls"	17	2
2020-10-24	Blackpink	"Pretty Savage"	25	1
2020-11-07	Monsta X	"You Can't Hold My Heart"	4	1
2021-04-03	Rosé	"On the Ground"	15	1
2021-04-24	BTS	"Film Out"	15	1
2021-04-24	Blackpink	"Ddu-Du Ddu-Du"	20	1
2021-06-05	BTS	"Butter"	11	1
2021-10-02	Lisa	"Lalisa"	16	1
2022-05-07	Coldplay & BTS	"My Universe"	16	1 (R) 2
2022-05-21	Psy feat. Suga	"That That"	14	2
2023-06-10	Fifty Fifty	"Cupid"	1 (Note: Peaked at No. 1 on 2023-12-16 (1 week))	3 (R) 10
2023-07-08	Twice	"Moonlight Sunrise"	17	1
2023-07-29	NewJeans	"Super Shy"	23	1
2023-10-21	Blackpink	"Shut Down"	18	1
2024-03-30	V	"Fri(end)s"	4	1
2024-03-30	Jihyo	"Killin' Me Good"	13	1
2024-03-30	NewJeans	"ETA"	16	1
2024-06-01	Charlie Puth feat. Jungkook	"Left and Right"	10	1
2024-10-12	Twice	"Set Me Free"	12	1
2024-10-19	Jungkook feat. Latto	"Seven"	3	1 (R) 6
2024-11-02	Rosé & Bruno Mars	"Apt."	3	2 (R) 16
2024-11-16	BTS & Charli XCX	"Dream Glow"	25	1
2025-03-08	Rosé	"Toxic Till the End"	24	1
2025-05-17	Maroon 5 feat. Lisa	"Priceless"	8	1
2025-06-21	Le Sserafim	"Come Over"	5	2
2025-07-05	J-Hope & GloRilla	"Killin' It Girl"	9	2
2025-07-05	Le Sserafim	"Hot"	19	1
2025-07-12	Aespa	"Whiplash"	14	1
2025-07-12	Saja Boys, Andrew Choi, Neckwav, Danny Chung, Kevin Woo & samUIL Lee	"Your Idol"	1 (Total 3 weeks) (Note: Peaked at No. 1 on 2025-08-16 (2 weeks), 20205-10-25 (1 week))	1 (R) 20
2025-07-19	Huntrix, Ejae, Audrey Nuna & Rei Ami	"How It's Done"	1 (Note: Peaked at No. 1 (1 week))	2 (R) 17
2025-07-19	Saja Boys, Andrew Choi, Neckwav, Danny Chung, Kevin Woo & samUIL Lee	"Soda Pop"	1 (Note: Peaked at No. 1 on 2025-10-04 (1 week))	2 (R) 19
2025-08-02	Huntrix, Ejae, Audrey Nuna & Rei Ami	"Golden"	1 (Total 9 weeks) (Note: Peaked at No. 1 on 2025-09-13 (3 weeks) and on 2025-10-18 (2 weeks), 2026-01-17 (1 week), 2026-03-07 (2 weeks), 2026-03-21 (1 week))	1 (R) 26
2025-08-02	Huntrix, Ejae, Audrey Nuna & Rei Ami	"Takedown"	2	1 (R) 11
2025-09-20	Twice's Jeongyeon, Jihyo & Chaeyoung	"Takedown"	4	3 (R) 5
2025-09-20	Illit	"Jellyous"	23	1 (R) 2
2025-09-27	Twice	"Like 1"	24	1
2025-10-04	Huntrix, Ejae, Audrey Nuna & Rei Ami	"What It Sounds Like"	6	3 (R) 4
2025-10-04	Twice	"Strategy"	11	1
2025-10-04	Stray Kids	"Walkin on Water"	18	1
2025-10-18	Rumi, Jinu, Ejae, Andrew Choi & KPop Demon Hunters Cast	"Free"	9	1
2025-11-08	Stray Kids	"Creed"	9	1
2025-11-08	Cortis	"Go!"	13	1
2025-11-08	Stray Kids	"In My Head"	19	1
2025-11-29	Babymonster	"We Go Up"	12	2
2025-12-13	Tame Impala & Jennie	"Dracula" remix	3	1 (R) 23
2026-01-17	Huntrix: Alexiane Broque, Jeanne Jerosme & Clotilde Verry	"Golden (Briller), French version"	21	1
2026-04-04	BTS	"Swim"	10	1 (R) 3
2026-06-20	Lisa & Anitta & Rema	"Goals"	6	1
2026-06-20	Jennie feat. Dominic Fike	"Love Hangover"	19	1
2026-06-20	Jennie feat. Doechii	"ExtraL"	20	1
2026-06-27	BTS	"Come Over"	19	1
2026-06-27	Illit	"It's Me"	9	1 (R) 6
2026-07-04	Illit	"Not Cute Anymore"	2	1 (R) 2
2026-07-25	Illit & Sophie Powers	"Jellyous"	6	1 (R) 4
2026-07-25	Le Sserafim, Illit & Katseye	"Iconic by Mistake"	3	1 (R) 9
2026-07-25	Le Sserafim	"Boompala"	21	1 (R) 2
2026-08-22	BTS	"They Don't Know 'Bout Us"	21	1
2026-08-22	Stray Kids	"This & That"	25	1
2026-08-29	Aespa feat. G-Dragon	"WDA (Whole Different Animal)"	13	1
2026-08-29	BTS	"Please"	17	1
2026-09-26	Stray Kids	"Run It"	20	1
2026-09-26	Cortis	"RedRed"	22	1
2026-09-26	Hearts2Hearts	"Lemon Tang"	23	1
2026-10-31	Cortis	"YoungCreatorCrew"	24	1

=== Mainstream Top 40 Recurrents ===
Chart date	Artist	Song/Album title	Peak position	Weeks on chart
2021-01-16	BTS	"Dynamite"	5	8
2025-05-17	Rosé & Bruno Mars	"Apt."	1 (Total 3 weeks) (Note: Entered at No. 1 on 2025-05-17 (3 weeks))	16 (R) 17
2026-05-09	Huntrix, Ejae, Audrey Nuna & Rei Ami	"Golden"	1 (Total 3 weeks) (Note: Entered at No. 1 for three weeks)	26

=== Mexico Airplay ===
- Chart started 2011-10-01/ not updated since 2022-09-03, possibly discontinued
2011-10-01 – 2022-09-03

Chart date	Artist	Song/Album title	Peak position	Weeks on chart
2018-06-16	BTS	"Fake Love"	20	10
2018-09-15	BTS feat. Nicki Minaj	"Idol"	39	2 (R) 3
2018-11-10	Steve Aoki feat. BTS	"Waste It on Me"	48	1
2019-04-27	BTS feat. Halsey	"Boy with Luv"	1 (Total 2 weeks) (Note: Entered at No. 1 (1 week), returned to No. 1 on 2019-05-18 (1 week))	10
2019-04-27	Blackpink	"Kill This Love"	40	1
2020-09-05	BTS	"Dynamite"	1 (Total 4 weeks) (Note: 2020-10-03 (4 weeks))	20
2020-09-19	Blackpink and Selena Gomez	"Ice Cream"	20	5 (R) 11
2020-10-31	Blackpink	"Lovesick Girls"	41	3 (R) 6
2020-12-26	BTS	"Life Goes On"	50	1
2021-04-24	Rosé	"On the Ground"	46	1
2021-06-05	BTS	"Butter"	1 (Total 2 weeks) (Note: Peaked at No. 1 on 2021-06-12 (1 week), 2021-06-26 (1 week))	11
2021-07-31	BTS	"Permission to Dance"	34	3
2021-10-09	Coldplay & BTS	"My Universe"	2	20
2022-03-26	Momoland & Natti Natasha	"Yummy Yummy Love"	45	1
2022-07-02	BTS	"Yet to Come"	28	3
2022-07-09	Charlie Puth feat. Jungkook	"Left and Right"	4	9
2022-08-20	Benny Blanco, BTS & Snoop Dogg	"Bad Decisions"	33	3

=== Mexico Ingles Airplay ===
- Chart started 2011-10-01/ not updated since 2022-09-03, possibly discontinued
2011-10-01 – 2022-09-03

Chart date	Artist	Song/Album title	Peak position	Weeks on chart
2018-01-13	BTS feat. Desiigner	"MIC Drop" (Steve Aoki remix)	49	1
2018-06-02	BTS	"Fake Love"	1 (Note: 2018-06-16 (1 week))	14 (R) 15
2018-09-08	BTS feat. Nicki Minaj	"Idol"	24	5
2018-11-10	Steve Aoki feat. BTS	"Waste It on Me"	20	2
2019-04-20	BTS feat. Halsey	"Boy with Luv"	4	12 (R) 13
2019-04-20	Blackpink	"Kill This Love"	12	3
2019-11-09	BTS feat Lauv	"Make It Right remix"	14	1 (R) 5
2020-09-05	BTS	"Dynamite"	5	34 (R) 37
2020-09-26	Blackpink and Selena Gomez	"Ice Cream"	8	19
2020-10-31	Blackpink	"Lovesick Girls"	18	8
2020-12-26	BTS	"Life Goes On"	14	5
2021-04-17	Rosé	"On the Ground"	14	7
2021-06-05	BTS	"Butter"	4	9
2021-10-02	Coldplay & BTS	"My Universe"	1 (Total 3 weeks) (Note: Peaked at No. 1 on 2021-10-23 (3 weeks))	16 (R) 25
2021-10-30	Monsta X	"One Day"	27	1
2021-11-27	Lisa	"Money"	12	4
2022-03-05	Momoland & Natti Natasha	"Yummy Yummy Love"	22	7
2022-05-14	Psy feat. Suga	"That That"	19	1
2022-07-09	Charlie Puth feat. Jungkook	"Left and Right"	3	9
2022-08-20	Benny Blanco, BTS & Snoop Dogg	"Bad Decisions"	26	1

=== On-Demand Streaming Songs ===
- Chart started 2012-03-03/ discontinued after 2020-11-28
2012-03-03 – 2020-11-28

Chart date	Artist	Song/Album title	Peak position	Weeks on chart
2017-10-14	BTS	"DNA"	22	1
2017-12-16	BTS feat. Desiigner	"MIC Drop" (Steve Aoki remix)	44	1
2018-06-02	BTS	"Fake Love"	9	2 (R) 3
2018-09-08	BTS feat. Nicki Minaj	"Idol"	36	1
2019-04-27	BTS feat. Halsey	"Boy with Luv"	16	3
2020-06-13	Lady Gaga and Blackpink	"Sour Candy"	18	1
2020-09-05	BTS	"Dynamite"	4	10
2020-09-12	Blackpink and Selena Gomez	"Ice Cream"	13	1

=== Pop Airplay (also called Mainstream Top 40, Pop Songs and Top 40/CHR) ===
- Chart started 1992-10-03

Chart date	Artist	Song/Album title	Peak position	Weeks on chart
2012-09-29	Psy	"Gangnam Style"	10 (Note: Peaked at No. 10 on 2012-10-27 (1 week))	19
2017-12-23	BTS feat. Desiigner	"MIC Drop" (Steve Aoki remix)	25	10
2018-06-16	BTS	"Fake Love"	34	7
2018-12-01	Steve Aoki feat. BTS	"Waste It on Me"	38	2
2019-04-20	BTS feat. Halsey	"Boy with Luv"	22	9
2019-08-17	Monsta X feat. French Montana	"Who Do U Love?"	26	11
2019-11-16	BTS feat Lauv	"Make It Right remix"	24	2 (R) 15
2020-03-28	Monsta X	"You Can't Hold My Heart"	40	1
2020-08-29	BTS	"Dynamite"	5 (Note: Peaked at No. 5 on 2020-12-19 (1 week))	20
2020-09-12	Blackpink and Selena Gomez	"Ice Cream"	21	8
2021-01-02	Max Schneider feat. Suga	"Blueberry Eyes"	39	1 (R) 5
2021-02-06	Loona	"Star"	31	8
2021-05-29	BTS	"Butter"	7	20
2021-07-10	TXT	"Magic"	36	2 (R) 4
2021-10-09	Coldplay & BTS	"My Universe"	18	15
2021-10-16	Monsta X	"One Day"	30	10
2021-12-18	Lisa	"Money"	35	4
2021-12-25	Bibi & 347aidan	"The Weekend"	31	9
2022-01-08	Twice	"The Feels"	40	2
2022-05-28	AleXa	"Wonderland"	38	3
2022-07-09	Charlie Puth feat. Jungkook	"Left and Right"	11	17
2022-08-20	Benny Blanco, BTS & Snoop Dogg	"Bad Decisions"	26	7
2022-09-10	Blackpink	"Pink Venom"	32	8
2022-12-24	Jungkook	"Dreamers"	39	1
2023-01-14	(G)I-dle	"Nxde"	38	1 (R) 1
2023-05-20	Fifty Fifty	"Cupid"	7	20
2023-06-03	Kodak Black & NLE Choppa feat. Jimin, Jvke, Muni Long	"Angel Pt. 1"	35	6
2023-07-29	Jungkook feat. Latto	"Seven"	17	13
2023-09-02	(G)I-dle	"I Do"	26	15
2023-09-16	NewJeans	"Super Shy"	37	4
2023-10-14	Jungkook & Jack Harlow	"3D"	20	15
2023-11-04	The Kid Laroi, Jungkook & Central Cee	"Too Much"	15	15
2023-12-23	P1Harmony	"Fall in Love Again"	27	11
2023-12-30	Jungkook	"Standing Next to You"	22	16
2024-02-10	The Weeknd, Jennie & Lily-Rose Depp	"One of the Girls"	18	15
2024-06-08	Bibi & Jackson Wang	"Feeling Lucky"	31	9
2024-08-17	Lisa	"Rockstar"	37	3
2024-08-31	Jimin	"Who"	26	10
2024-11-02	Rosé & Bruno Mars	"Apt."	1 (Total 5 weeks) (Note: Peaked at No. 1 on 2025-02-01 (5 weeks))	28
2024-11-02	Lisa	"Moonlit Floor (Kiss Me)"	21	19
2024-12-14	Jennie	"Mantra"	35	10
2024-12-14	NCT Dream	"Rains in Heaven	39	1
2025-01-11	Twice	"Strategy"	37	6
2025-01-25	Rosé	"Toxic Till the End"	23	12
2025-02-22	Lisa feat. Doja Cat & Raye	"Born Again"	25	8
2025-04-26	Jennie	"Like Jennie"	30	11
2025-05-17	Maroon 5 feat. Lisa	"Priceless"	18	15
2025-07-12	Alex Warren & Rose	"On My Mind"	17	12
2025-07-26	Blackpink	"Jump"	19	13
2025-08-02	Huntrix, Ejae, Audrey Nuna & Rei Ami	"Golden"	1 (Total 3 weeks) (Note: Peaked at No. 1 on 2025-11-08 (2 weeks), 2025-12-13 (1 week))	40
2025-10-04	Jackson Wang	"Made Me a Man"	25	19
2025-11-08	Jisoo & Zayn Malik	"Eyes Closed"	30	8
2026-11-29	Tame Impala & Jennie	"Dracula" remix	1 (Total 12 weeks) (Note: Peaked at No. 1 on 2026-07-11 (5 weeks), 2026-08-22 (1 week), 2026-09-05 (1 week), 2026-10-03 (5 weeks))	52
2026-01-24	Huntrix, Ejae, Audrey Nuna & Rei Ami	"How It's Done"	31	6 (R) 11
2026-01-31	Nmixx	"Blue Valentine"	34	1 (R) 7
2026-01-31	Fifty Fifty	"Skittlez"	37	1 (R) 3
2026-03-07	Cortis	"Go!"	30	14
2026-03-21	Blackpink	"Go"	32	8
2026-04-04	BTS	"Swim"	11	15
2026-05-16	Monsta X	"Heal"	33	7
2026-06-13	Taemin	"Long Way Home"	40	1
2026-07-18	Khalid & Ahn Hyo-seop	"Something Special"	34	12
2026-08-01	Babymonster	"Choom"	39	1
2026-08-15	BTS	"Normal"	40	1
2026-10-03	Rosé	"New Trick"	19	8

=== Pop Digital Song Sales ===
- Chart started 2011-10-01/ discontinued after 2020-01-18
2011-10-01 – 2020-01-18

Chart date	Artist	Song/Album title	Peak position	Weeks on chart
2018-11-03	Steve Aoki feat. BTS	"Waste It on Me"	7	2
2018-11-03	Dua Lipa & Blackpink	"Kiss and Make Up"	10	1
2018-11-17	K/DA feat. (G)I-dle's Miyeon & Soyeon, Madison Beer & Jaira Burns	"Pop/Stars"	10	2
2019-06-22	BTS and Charli XCX	"Dream Glow"	4	1
2019-06-29	BTS and Zara Larsson	"A Brand New Day"	12	1
2019-10-12	J-Hope feat. Becky G	"Chicken Noodle Soup"	6	1
2019-10-19	SuperM	"Jopping"	25	1
2019-12-14	Halsey & Suga & BTS	"Suga's Interlude"	9	2

=== R&B Digital Song Sales ===
- Chart started 2012-11-10 and discontinued after 2026-06-27
2017-02-18 – 2026-06-27

Chart date	Artist	Song/Album title	Peak position	Weeks on chart
2017-02-18	Gallant & Tablo & Eric Nam	"Cave Me In"	20	1
2021-05-29	Jay B feat. Sokodomo	"Switch It Up"	6	1
2021-01-01	Suppasit Jongcheveevat & Sam Kim	"Before 4:30 (She Said...)"	4	1
2022-12-17	RM with Paul Blanco & Mahalia	"Closer"	1	1
2023-07-08	The Weeknd, Jennie & Lily-Rose Depp	"One of the Girls"	11	1
2024-01-13	Umi & V	"Wherever U R"	1	1

=== R&B/Hip-Hop Digital Song Sales ===
- Chart discontinued after 2026-06-27
2019-07-06 – 2026-06-27

Chart date	Artist	Song/Album title	Peak position	Weeks on chart
2019-07-06	BTS and Juice Wrld	"All Night"	6	1
2019-11-23	True Damage feat. Becky G, Keke Palmer, (G)I-dle's Soyeon, Duckwrth & Thutmose	"Giants"	19	1
2021-05-29	Jay B feat. Sokodomo	"Switch It Up"	18	1
2021-09-25	Lisa	"Money"	2	1
2021-12-25	Juice Wrld & Suga	"Girl of My Dreams"	1	2
2021-01-01	Suppasit Jongcheveevat & Sam Kim	"Before 4:30 (She Said...)"	8	1
2022-12-17	RM with Paul Blanco & Mahalia	"Closer"	1	1
2023-03-18	J-Hope with J. Cole	"On the Street"	1 (Note: Debuted at No. 2 (1 week), moved to No. 1 on 2023-03-25 (1 week))	5
2023-05-27	Kodak Black & NLE Choppa feat. Jimin, Jvke, Muni Long	"Angel Pt. 1"	1 (Note: Peaked at No. 1 on 2023-06-03 (1 week))	3 (R) 5
2023-07-08	The Weeknd, Jennie & Lily-Rose Depp	"One of the Girls"	19	1
2024-01-13	Umi & V	"Wherever U R"	2	1
2024-09-21	Megan Thee Stallion & RM	"Neva Play"	1	2
2025-03-15	Lisa feat. Future	"Fxck Up the World"	8	1

=== Radio Songs (previously called Hot 100 Airplay) ===
- Chart started 1984-10-20; available dates from 1990-11-03

Chart date	Artist	Song/Album title	Peak position	Weeks on chart
2012-09-29	Psy	"Gangnam Style"	12	13
2020-09-19	BTS	"Dynamite"	10	19
2021-06-05	BTS	"Butter"	20	14
2021-11-06	Coldplay & BTS	"My Universe"	25	11
2022-08-06	Charlie Puth feat. Jungkook	"Left and Right"	28	12
2023-06-17	Fifty Fifty	"Cupid"	13	14
2023-08-26	Jungkook feat. Latto	"Seven"	43	7
2023-11-25	The Kid Laroi, Jungkook & Central Cee	"Too Much"	38	6
2024-02-23	The Weeknd, Jennie & Lily-Rose Depp	"One of the Girls"	48	3
2024-11-30	Rosé & Bruno Mars	"Apt."	4	41
2025-05-31	Maroon 5 & Lisa	"Priceless"	35	11
2025-08-30	Huntrix, Ejae, Audrey Nuna & Rei Ami	"Golden"	1 (Note: Peaked at No. 1 on 2026-01-03 (1 week))	39
2026-04-04	BTS	"Swim"	18	13
2026-04-18	Tame Impala & Jennie	"Dracula" remix	1 (Total 9 weeks) (Note: Peaked at No. 1 on 2026-09-26 (9 weeks))	32

=== Rap Digital Song Sales ===
- Chart started 2010-01-23 and discontinued after 2026-06-27
2016-09-10 – 2026-06-27

Chart date	Artist	Song/Album title	Peak position	Weeks on chart
2016-09-10	CL	Lifted	31	1
2019-07-06	BTS and Juice Wrld	"All Night"	5	1
2019-10-12	J-Hope feat. Becky G	"Chicken Noodle Soup"	3	1
2019-11-23	True Damage feat. Becky G, Keke Palmer, (G)I-dle's Soyeon, Duckwrth & Thutmose	"Giants"	15	1
2020-06-06	Suga (Agust D)	"Daechwita"	1	1 (R) 2
2020-06-06	Suga (Agust D) feat. RM	"Strange"	4	1
2020-06-06	Suga (Agust D) feat. Max Schneider	"Burn It"	5	1
2020-06-06	Suga (Agust D)	"What Do You Think?"	6	1
2020-06-06	Suga (Agust D)	"Moonlight"	7	1
2020-06-06	Suga (Agust D)	"People"	8	1 (R) 2
2020-06-06	Suga (Agust D)	"Honsool"	9	1
2021-09-25	Lisa	"Money"	1	1
2021-12-25	Juice Wrld & Suga	"Girl of My Dreams"	1	2
2022-06-25	BTS	"N.O"	7	1
2022-06-25	BTS feat. Supreme Boi	"BTS Cypher Pt. 3: Killer"	8	1
2022-07-30	J-Hope	"Arson"	1	1 (R) 3
2022-07-30	J-Hope	"Safety Zone"	3	1 (R) 2
2022-07-30	J-Hope	"Pandora's Box"	4	1
2022-07-30	J-Hope	"Future"	5	1 (R) 2
2022-07-30	J-Hope	"What If..."	6	1
2022-07-30	J-Hope	"Stop"	7	1 (R) 2
2022-09-10	Balming Tiger feat. RM	"Sexy Nukim"	3	2
2022-10-01	NCT 127	"2 Baddies"	13	1
2022-12-17	RM with Anderson .Paak	"Still Life"	1	1
2022-12-17	RM with Erykah Badu	"Yun"	2	1
2022-12-17	RM with Tablo	"All Day"	3	1
2023-03-18	J-Hope with J. Cole	"On the Street"	1	5
2023-04-22	Agust D & IU	"People Pt. 2"	1	2
2023-05-06	Agust D	"Haegeum"	1	2
2023-05-06	Agust D feat. J-Hope	"Huh?!"	2	1
2023-05-06	Agust D feat. Ryuichi Sakamoto & Woosung	"Snooze"	3	1
2023-05-06	Agust D	"D-Day"	4	1
2023-05-06	Agust D	"SDL"	6	1
2023-05-06	Agust D	"Polar Night"	6	1 (R) 2
2023-05-27	Kodak Black & NLE Choppa feat. Jimin, Jvke, Muni Long	"Angel Pt. 1"	1	3 (R) 5
2024-06-08	RM	"Nuts"	2	1 (R) 2
2024-06-08	RM	"Right People, Wrong Place"	3	1
2024-06-08	RM	"Groin"	4	1
2024-06-08	RM & Little Simz	"Domodachi"	5	1
2024-06-08	RM	"Out of Love"	6	1
2024-06-08	RM, Domi and JD Beck	"? (Interlude)"	7	1
2024-07-06	Lisa	"Rockstar"	2	2
2024-09-07	Suga (Agust D)	"The Last"	3	1
2024-09-21	Megan Thee Stallion & RM	"Neva Play"	1	1
2025-03-08	Don Toliver, J-Hope & Speedy, feat. Pharrell Williams	"LV Bag"	3	1
2025-03-15	Lisa feat. Future	"Fxck Up the World"	6	1
2025-03-15	Lisa feat. Megan Thee Stallion	"Rapunzel"	9	1
2025-05-17	Tablo & RM	"Stop the Rain"	1	1

=== Rhythmic Airplay (Complete) ===
- Chart started 1992-10-03

Chart date	Artist	Song/Album title	Peak position	Weeks on chart
2012-11-06	Psy	"Gangnam Style"	15	10
2018-02-03	BTS feat. Desiigner	"MIC Drop" (Steve Aoki remix)	40	1
2021-06-12	BTS	"Butter"	37	6
2023-11-11	The Kid Laroi, Jungkook & Central Cee	"Too Much"	13	12
2023-12-23	The Weeknd, Jennie & Lily-Rose Depp	"One of the Girls"	8	20
2025-02-15	Rosé & Bruno Mars	"Apt."	35	8 (R) 9
2026-04-04	BTS	"Swim"	30	5

=== Rock & Alternative Airplay ===
Chart date	Artist	Song/Album title	Peak position	Weeks on chart
2021-10-02	Coldplay & BTS	"My Universe"	10	20
2025-10-11	Tame Impala & Jennie	"Dracula" remix	1 (Total 2 weeks) (Note: Peaked at No. 1 on 2026-05-23 (2 weeks))	46

=== Rock Digital Song Sales ===
- Chart started 2010-01-23 and discontinued after 2026-06-27
2018-01-03 – 2026-06-27

Chart date	Artist	Song/Album title	Peak position	Weeks on chart
2018-01-03	Fall Out Boy feat. RM	"Champion Remix"	2	2 (R) 5
2021-10-09	Coldplay & BTS	"My Universe"	1 (Total 11 weeks) (Note: Entered at No. 1 (6 weeks), returned to No. 1 on 2021-11-27 (1 week), 2021-12-11 (1 week), 2022-01-08 (2 weeks), 2022-03-05 (1 week))	15 (R) 25
2024-06-08	RM	"Heaven"	20	1
2025-10-11	Tame Impala & Jennie	"Dracula" remix	1 (Total 6 weeks) (Note: Peaked at No. 1 on 2026-04-18 (3 weeks), 2026-05-16 (3 weeks))	1 (R) 18

=== Songs Of The Summer ===
- Chart started 2010-07-17 and runs in the summer, from Memorial Day through Labor Day.

Chart date	Artist	Song/Album title	Peak position	Weeks on chart
2021-06-26	BTS	"Butter"	1 (Total 12 weeks) (Note: Entered at No. 1 for 12 weeks, the entire summer season)	12
2023-07-29	Fifty Fifty	"Cupid"	19	2 (R) 5
2025-06-07	Rosé & Bruno Mars	"Apt."	16	9
2025-08-16	Huntrix, Ejae, Audrey Nuna & Rei Ami	"Golden"	7	4
2026-06-06	Tame Impala & Jennie	"Dracula" remix	9	15

=== Streaming Songs ===
- Chart started 2013-01-19

Chart date	Artist	Song/Album title	Peak position	Weeks on chart
2013-01-26	PSY	"Gangnam Style"	1 (Total 6weeks) (Note: Streaming Songs chart started on Jan 19, 2013. And Psy's Gangnam Style stayed on the chart for 49 straight weeks from Jan 26 to Dec 28, 2013. Those 122 weeks shown in Psy's chart-history seem to include re-entries)	49 (R) 122
2013-04-27	PSY	"Gentleman"	1 (Total 2 weeks)	19
2014-06-27	PSY feat. Snoop Dogg	"Hangover"	4	1
2017-10-14	BTS	"DNA"	38	1
2017-12-16	BTS feat. Desiigner	'MIC Drop" (Steve Aoki remix)	47	1
2018-06-02	BTS	"Fake Love"	7	3
2018-06-30	Blackpink	"Ddu-Du Ddu-Du"	39	1
2018-09-08	BTS feat. Nicki Minaj	"Idol"	11	1
2018-11-03	Pinkfong	"Baby Shark"	14	6 (R) 59
2019-04-20	Blackpink	"Kill This Love"	22	2
2019-04-27	BTS feat. Halsey	"Boy with Luv"	5	4
2020-03-07	BTS	"On"	12	1
2020-06-13	Lady Gaga and Blackpink	"Sour Candy"	22	1
2020-07-04	Jawsh 685, Jason Derulo & BTS	"Savage Love (Laxed – Siren Beat)"	9	–
2020-07-11	Blackpink	"How You Like That"	18	1
2020-09-05	BTS	"Dynamite"	3	14 (R) 15
2020-09-12	Blackpink	"Ice Cream"	8	2
2020-10-16	Blackpink	"Lovesick Girls"	46	1
2020-12-05	BTS	"Life Goes On"	14	1
2021-06-05	BTS	"Butter"	4 (Note: On the 2021-09-04 chart, the Megan Thee Stallion remix was credited with a rebound to No. 35)	11
2021-07-24	BTS	"Permission to Dance"	8	3
2021-10-09	Coldplay & BTS	"My Universe"	21	5
2022-06-25	BTS	"Yet to Come"	27	1
2022-07-09	Charlie Puth feat. Jungkook	"Left and Right"	23	2
2022-08-20	Benny Blanco, BTS & Snoop Dogg	"Bad Decisions"	28	1
2022-09-03	Blackpink	"Pink Venom"	9	2 (R) 3
2022-10-01	Blackpink	"Shut Down"	10	2
2023-04-08	Jimin	"Like Crazy"	35	2
2023-04-22	Fifty Fifty	"Cupid"	8	17
2023-07-29	Jungkook feat. Latto	"Seven"	4	8
2023-07-29	NewJeans	"Super Shy"	32	2
2023-10-14	Jungkook & Jack Harlow	"3D"	12	1
2023-11-18	Jungkook	"Standing Next to You"	25	1
2024-02-10	The Weeknd, Jennie & Lily-Rose Depp	"One of the Girls"	44	1
2024-08-03	Jimin	"Who"	11	34
2024-09-21	Megan Thee Stallion & RM	"Neva Play"	42	1
2024-11-02	Rosé & Bruno Mars	"Apt."	2	30 (R) 37
2025-07-12	Huntrix, Ejae, Audrey Nuna & Rei Ami	"Golden"	1 (Total 12 weeks) (Note: Peaked at No. 1 on 2025-08-02 (12 weeks))	46 (R) 66
2025-07-12	Saja Boys, Andrew Choi, Neckwav, Danny Chung, Kevin Woo & samUIL Lee	"Your Idol"	3	22 (R) 23
2025-07-12	Huntrix, Ejae, Audrey Nuna & Rei Ami	"How It's Done"	5	22 (R) 23
2025-07-12	Saja Boys, Andrew Choi, Neckwav, Danny Chung, Kevin Woo & samUIL Lee	"Soda Pop"	3	23 (R) 26
2025-07-12	Huntrix, Ejae, Audrey Nuna & Rei Ami	"What It Sounds Like"	6	21
2025-07-12	Rumi, Jinu, Ejae, Andrew Choi & KPop Demon Hunters Cast	"Free"	8	20
2025-07-19	Huntrix, Ejae, Audrey Nuna & Rei Ami	"Takedown"	8	19
2025-07-26	Blackpink	"Jump"	18	2
2025-08-30	Twice's Jeongyeon, Jihyo & Chaeyoung	"Takedown"	37	4
2025-08-30	Twice	"Strategy"	41	2
2025-11-01	Tame Impala & Jennie	"Dracula" remix	6	41
2026-04-04	BTS	"Swim"	2	5
2026-04-04	BTS	"Body to Body"	19	2
2026-04-04	BTS	"Hooligan"	28	1
2026-04-04	BTS	"Fya"	30	1
2026-04-04	BTS	"Normal"	36	1
2026-04-04	BTS	"Aliens"	42	1
2026-04-04	BTS	"2.0"	49	1
2026-06-27	Le Sserafim, Illit & Katseye	"Iconic by Mistake"	29	2

=== TikTok Billboard Top 50 (Complete) ===
- Chart started 2023-09-16 and discontinued 2025-03-01.

Chart Date	Artist	Song/Album title	Peak position	Weeks on chart
2023-09-30	Fifty Fifty	"Cupid (Twin Ver. – Sped Up Ver.)"	49	1
2023-12-30	The Weeknd, Jennie & Lily-Rose Depp	"One of the Girls"	40	4
2024-03-09	Max feat. Huh Yunjin	"Stupid in Love"	27	1
2024-11-02	Rosé & Bruno Mars	"Apt."	15	9 (R) 10

== See also ==
- List of K-pop on the Billboard charts
- List of K-pop albums on the Billboard charts
- List of K-pop on the Billboard year-end charts
- Timeline of K-pop at Billboard
- Timeline of K-pop at Billboard in the 2020s
- Korea K-Pop Hot 100
- List of K-pop artists
- List of South Korean idol groups
- World Digital Song Sales
