= Lisa (rapper) discography =

Lisa discography
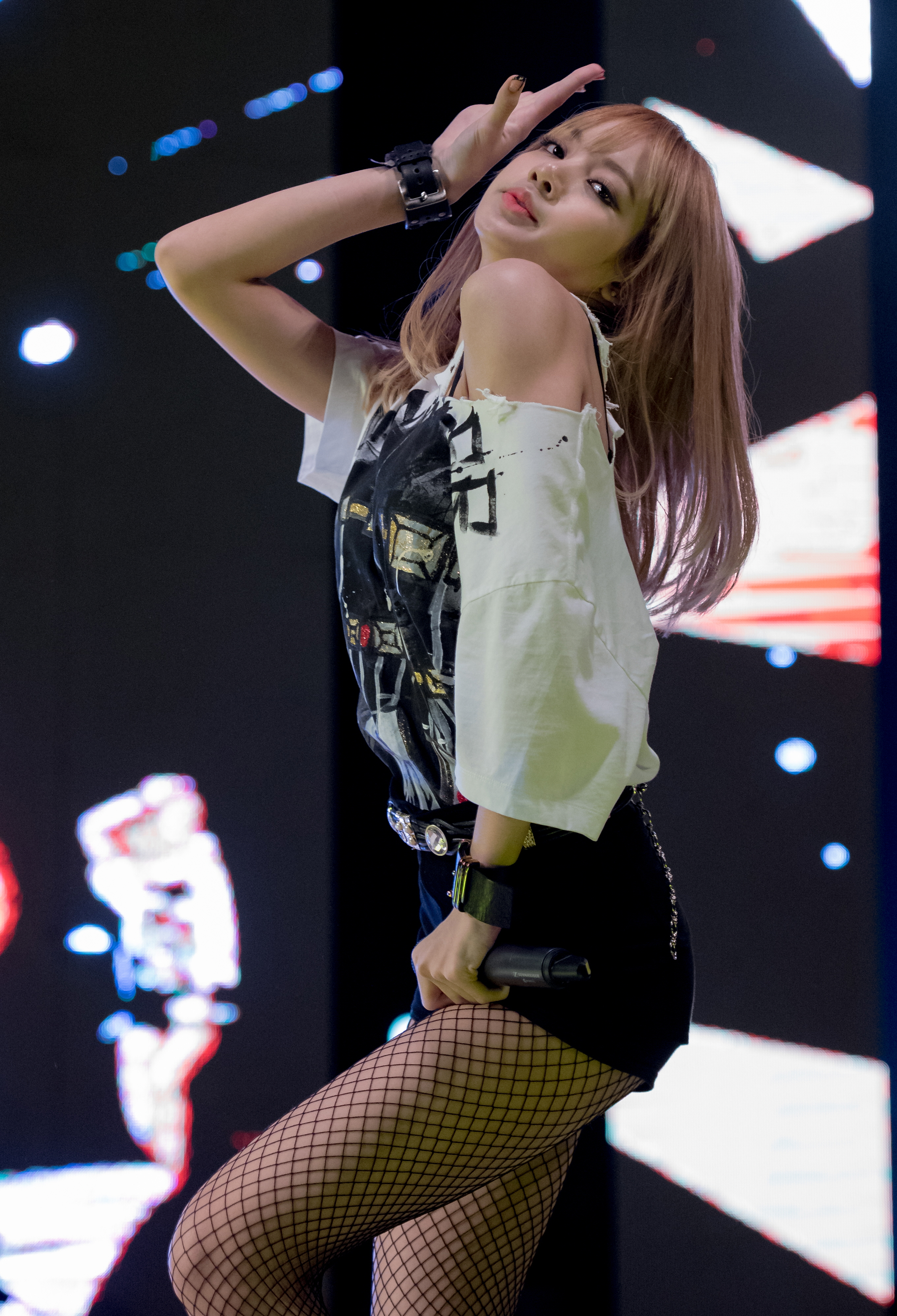
- Lisa in 2017
- Studio albums: 1
- EPs: 1
- Singles: 14
- Music videos: 14
- Single albums: 1

Thai rapper and singer Lisa has released one studio album, one extended play, one single album, and fourteen singles (including one as a featured artist).

Lisa began her career as a member of South Korean girl group Blackpink in August 2016. She released her debut solo single album Lalisa through YG Entertainment and Interscope Records in September 2021. It debuted at number one on the Circle Album Chart in South Korea and was certified triple platinum for surpassing 750,000 copies sold. The album's lead single of the same name peaked at number two on the Billboard Global 200 and in Singapore as well as number one in Malaysia. The album's second single "Money" also saw commercial success and peaked at number one in Malaysia, number two in Singapore, and number ten on the Billboard Global 200. It received several international certifications including platinum in New Zealand, silver in the United Kingdom, and gold in France.

Lisa released her debut studio album Alter Ego in 2025 through her self-founded management company Lloud and RCA Records. It debuted in the top 10 in countries including Australia, Belgium, France, Germany, the Netherlands, Switzerland, and the United States, and reached number one on the Top Album Sales chart. The lead single "Rockstar" became her first number-one single on the Billboard Global Excl. US and peaked at number four on the Billboard Global 200. It entered the top five in Hong Kong, Indonesia, Malaysia, Singapore, Taiwan, and Indonesia, and was certified gold in the United States. Lisa's follow-up singles "New Woman" featuring Rosalía and "Moonlit Floor (Kiss Me)" reached the top ten in Malaysia, Singapore, and Taiwan, with the former reaching number 15 on the Billboard Global 200. The fourth single "Born Again" featuring Doja Cat and Raye became her first number-one on the newly launched Official Thailand Chart, while the following single "Fxck Up the World" peaked at number two. Lisa achieved her second number-one song in Thailand with the album track "Dream".

== Albums ==
=== Studio albums ===
List of studio albums, showing selected details, selected chart positions, sales, and certifications
Title	Details	Peak chart positions										Sales	Certifications
Title	Details	AUS	CAN	FRA	GER	JPN	KOR Retail	NZ	POL	UK	US	Sales	Certifications
Alter Ego	Released: February 28, 2025; Label: Lloud, RCA; Formats: CD, LP, digital download, streaming	5	21	3	2	18	6	11	4	20	7	JPN: 5,908 (Note: Japanese sales of Alter Ego: Physical sales: 5,449; Digital sales: 459); KOR: 32,639; US: 28,000	ZPAV: Gold

== Extended plays ==
List of extended plays, with selected details, chart positions and sales
Title	Details	Peak chart positions										Sales
Title	Details	AUS	BEL (WA)	FRA	GER	JPN	KOR Retail	NZ	SCO	SWI	US	Sales
Press Play	Released: October 23, 2026; Label: Lloud, RCA; Formats: CD, LP, digital download, streaming	34	10	20	37	42	21	36	16	17	35	JPN: 1,132; KOR: 7,030

== Single albums ==
List of single albums, with selected details, selected chart positions, sales, and certifications
Title	Details	Peak chart positions				Sales	Certifications
Title	Details	BEL (WA)	FIN Phy.	JPN Cmb.	KOR	Sales	Certifications
Lalisa	Released: September 10, 2021; Label: YG, Interscope; Formats: CD, LP, digital download, streaming	144	10	40	1	KOR: 854,964	KMCA: 3× Platinum

== Singles ==
=== As lead artist ===
List of singles as lead artist, with year released, selected chart positions, sales, certifications, and album name
Title	Year	Peak chart positions										Sales	Certifications	Album
Title	Year	THA	CAN	FRA	KOR	MLY	NZ	SGP	UK	US	WW	Sales	Certifications	Album
"Lalisa"	2021	—	42	175	64	1	— (Note: "Lalisa" did not enter the NZ Top 40 Singles Chart, but peaked at number 10 on the NZ Hot 40 Singles Chart.)	2	68	84	2	US: 9,200		Lalisa
"SG" (with DJ Snake, Ozuna and Megan Thee Stallion)	2021	—	86	87	— (Note: "SG" did not enter the Gaon Digital Chart, but peaked at number 173 on the Gaon Download Chart.)	17	— (Note: "SG" did not enter the NZ Top 40 Singles Chart, but peaked at number 10 on the NZ Hot 40 Singles Chart.)	26	— (Note: "SG" did not enter the UK Singles Chart, but peaked at number 24 on the UK Singles Downloads Chart.)	— (Note: "SG" did not enter the Billboard Hot 100 but peaked at number 2 on the Bubbling Under Hot 100 chart.)	19	US: 3,500; WW: 19,000	SNEP: Gold	Non-album single
"Money"	2021	—	37	75	— (Note: "Money" did not enter the Gaon Digital Chart, but peaked at number 43 on the Gaon Download Chart.)	1	35	2	46	90	10	US: 8,200; WW: 4,400	BPI: Silver; RMNZ: Platinum; SNEP: Gold	Lalisa
"Rockstar"	2024	— (Note: "Rockstar" did not enter the Official Thailand Chart, but peaked at number seven on the Billboard Thailand Songs chart in 2026.)	51	90	120	2	— (Note: "Rockstar" did not enter the NZ Top 40 Singles Chart, but peaked at number 3 on the NZ Hot 40 Singles Chart.)	4	49	70	4	US: 6,100; WW: 44,000	MC: Gold; RIAA: Gold	Alter Ego
"New Woman" (featuring Rosalía)	2024	—	80	76	147	4	— (Note: "New Woman" did not enter the NZ Top 40 Singles Chart, but peaked at number 6 on the NZ Hot 40 Singles Chart.)	8	55	97	15	WW: 10,000	RIAA: Gold	Alter Ego
"Moonlit Floor (Kiss Me)"	2024	12	88	—	161	5	— (Note: "Moonlit Floor (Kiss Me)" did not enter the NZ Top 40 Singles Chart, but peaked at number 5 on the NZ Hot 40 Singles Chart.)	6	— (Note: "Moonlit Floor (Kiss Me)" did not enter the UK Singles Chart, but peaked at number 1 on the UK Singles Downloads Chart.)	— (Note: "Moonlit Floor (Kiss Me)" did not enter the Billboard Hot 100 but peaked at number 21 on the Bubbling Under Hot 100 chart.)	24		RIAA: Gold	Alter Ego
"Born Again" (featuring Doja Cat and Raye)	2025	1	53	62	192	13	36	7	13	68	22	US: 1,900	BPI: Silver; RIAA: Gold; RMNZ: Gold	Alter Ego
"Fxck Up the World" (featuring Future)	2025	2	85	—	— (Note: "Fxck Up the World" did not enter the Circle Digital Chart, but peaked at number 62 on the Circle Download Chart.)	18	— (Note: "Fxck Up the World" did not enter the NZ Top 40 Singles Chart, but peaked at number 4 on the NZ Hot Singles Chart.)	12	— (Note: "Fxck Up the World" did not enter the UK Singles Chart, but peaked at number 96 on the UK Singles Downloads Chart.)	— (Note: "Fxck Up the World" did not enter the Billboard Hot 100 but peaked at number 6 on the Bubbling Under Hot 100 chart.)	25			Alter Ego
"Bad Angel" (with Anyma)	2026	—	—	—	— (Note: "Bad Angel" did not enter the Circle Digital Chart, but peaked at number 100 on the Circle Download Chart.)	—	— (Note: "Bad Angel" did not enter the NZ Top 40 Singles Chart, but peaked at number 21 on the NZ Hot Singles Chart.)	—	— (Note: "Bad Angel" did not enter the UK Singles Chart, but peaked at number 85 on the UK Singles Downloads Chart.)	—	—			Non-album single
"Goals" (with Anitta and Rema)	2026	—	—	—	— (Note: "Goals" did not enter the Circle Digital Chart, but peaked at number 157 on the Circle Download Chart.)	—	— (Note: "Goals" did not enter the NZ Top 40 Singles Chart, but peaked at number 34 on the NZ Hot Singles Chart.)	—	—	—	—			Official FIFA World Cup 2026 Album
"Sawadika"	2026	3	70	123	— (Note: "Sawadika" did not enter the Circle Digital Chart, but peaked at number 70 on the Circle Download Chart.)	7	— (Note: "Sawadika" did not enter the NZ Top 40 Singles Chart, but peaked at number 5 on the NZ Hot 40 Singles Chart.)	1	66	69	23	US: 1,900		Press Play
"Tarantino"	2026	5	—	—	— (Note: "Tarantino" did not enter the Circle Digital Chart, but peaked at number 87 on the Circle Download Chart.)	— (Note: "Tarantino" did not enter the Official Malaysia Chart, but peaked at number 18 on the RIM International Singles Chart.)	— (Note: "Tarantino" did not enter the NZ Top 40 Singles Chart, but peaked at number 3 on the NZ Hot 40 Singles Chart.)	11	—	— (Note: "Tarantino" did not enter the Billboard Hot 100 but peaked at number 6 on the Bubbling Under Hot 100 chart.)	97			Press Play
"Leave with Me"	2026	—	—	—	—	—	—	—	—	—	—			Non-album single
"—" denotes a recording that did not chart or was not released in that territory.

=== As featured artist ===
List of singles as featured artist, with year released, selected chart positions, and album name
Title	Year	Peak chart positions										Album
Title	Year	THA	CAN	KOR DL	MLY Int.	NZ Hot	SGP	TWN	UK	US	WW	Album
"Priceless" (Maroon 5 featuring Lisa)	2025	2	80	56	9	7	20	17	69	76	40	Love Is Like

== Other charted songs ==
List of other charted songs, with year released, selected chart positions, and album name
Title	Year	Peak chart positions										Album
Title	Year	THA	THA Songs	KOR	MLY Int.	NZ Hot	SGP	US D/P	US Rap Dig.	VIE Hot	WW	Album
"Shoong!" (슝!) (Taeyang featuring Lisa)	2023	—	—	119	— (Note: "Shoong!" did not enter the RIM International Singles Chart, but peaked at number 11 on the Billboard Malaysia Songs chart.)	31	9	—	—	35	143	Down to Earth
"Moonlit Floor (Kiss Me)" (Santa Baby remix)	2024	—	—	—	—	22	—	—	—	—	—	Non-album song
"Elastigirl"	2025	—	—	—	—	28	—	—	—	—	—	Alter Ego
"Rapunzel" (featuring Megan Thee Stallion)	2025	16	—	— (Note: "Rapunzel" did not enter the Circle Digital Chart, but peaked at number 193 on the Circle Download Chart.)	—	27	—	—	9	—	— (Note: "Rapunzel" did not enter the Billboard Global 200, but peaked at number 165 on the Billboard Global Excl. US.)	Alter Ego
"When I'm with You" (featuring Tyla)	2025	6	—	—	—	22	—	—	—	—	—	Alter Ego
"Chill"	2025	—	—	—	—	—	—	15	—	—	—	Alter Ego
"Dream"	2025	1	—	—	25	—	—	—	—	17	— (Note: "Dream" did not enter the Billboard Global 200, but peaked at number 122 on the Billboard Global Excl. US.)	Alter Ego
"V12"	2026	—	11	—	—	—	—	—	—	—	—	Press Play
"Cobra"	2026	—	12	—	—	—	—	—	—	—	—	Press Play
"Cut U Off"	2026	—	9	—	—	37	—	—	—	—	—	Press Play
"Sweat"	2026	—	8	—	—	—	—	—	—	—	—	Press Play
"—" denotes a recording that did not chart or was not released in that territory.

== Songwriting credits ==
All credits are adapted from the American Society of Composers, Authors and Publishers and Broadcast Music Incorporated databases, unless otherwise noted.

List of songs written, with year released, artist, song name, and album name
Year	Artist	Song	Album	Lyricist		Composer	
Year	Artist	Song	Album	Credited	With	Credited	With
2021	DJ Snake, Ozuna, Megan Thee Stallion and Lisa	"SG"	Non-album single	Yes	DJ Snake, Ozuna, Megan Thee Stallion, Donny Flores, J.Lauren, Jean Pierre Soto, Lewis Hughes, Omar Walker, Teddy	Yes	DJ Snake, Ozuna, Megan Thee Stallion, Donny Flores, J.Lauren, Jean Pierre Soto, Lewis Hughes, Omar Walker, Teddy
2024	Lisa	"Rockstar"	Alter Ego	Yes	Brittany Amaradio, James Essien, Lucy Healey, Ryan Tedder, Sam Hormaee	Yes	Brittany Amaradio, James Essien, Lucy Healey, Ryan Tedder, Sam Hormaee
2024	Lisa and Rosalía	"New Woman"	Alter Ego	Yes	Rosalía Vila Tobella, Max Martin, Ilya Salmanzadeh, Tove Lo, Tove Burman	Yes	Rosalía Vila Tobella, Max Martin, Ilya Salmanzadeh, Tove Lo, Tove Burman
2025	Lisa	"Elastigirl"	Alter Ego	Yes	Cooper Holzman, Elle Campbell, Rollo, Connor Blake	Yes	Cooper Holzman, Elle Campbell, Rollo, Connor Blake
2025	Lisa	"Thunder"	Alter Ego	Yes	Ilya Salmazadeh, Robin Tadros, Abby Keen	Yes	Ilya Salmazadeh, Robin Tadros, Abby Keen
2025	Lisa and Future	"Fxck Up the World"	Alter Ego	Yes	Nayvadius Wilburn, Jaeyoung Lee, Michael Mule, Isaac De Boni, Jacob Canady, Derrick Miller, Nija Charles	Yes	Nayvadius Wilburn, Jaeyoung Lee, Michael Mule, Isaac De Boni, Jacob Canady, Derrick Miller, Nija Charles
2025	Lisa and Megan Thee Stallion	"Rapunzel"	Alter Ego	Yes	Megan Pete, Ryan Tedder, Sam Homaee, Gregory Hein, Carly Gilbert	Yes	Megan Pete, Ryan Tedder, Sam Homae, Gregory Hein, Carly Gilbert
2025	Lisa and Tyla	"When I'm with You"	Alter Ego	Yes	Tyla Seethal, Samuel Awuku, Richard Isong, Ariowa Irosogie, Imani Lewis, Corey Lindsay-Keay	Yes	Tyla Seethal, Samuel Awuku, Richard Isong, Ariowa Irosogie, Imani Lewis, Corey Lindsay-Keay
2025	Lisa	"Badgrrrl"	Alter Ego	Yes	Mark Williams, Raul Cubina, Nathan Chen, Phillip Mueller, Risvi Tareq, Mouad Oudra, Kobe Hood	Yes	Mark Williams, Raul Cubina, Nathan Chen, Phillip Mueller, Risvi Tareq, Mouad Oudra, Kobe Hood
2025	Lisa	"Lifestyle"	Alter Ego	Yes	Ryan Tedder, Sam Homaee, Grant Boutin, Abby Keen, James Essein	Yes	Ryan Tedder, Sam Homaee, Grant Boutin, Abby Keen, James Essein
2025	Lisa	"Chill"	Alter Ego	Yes	Mikkel S. Eriksen, Tor Hermansen, Zegon, Laudz, Samuel Awuku, Ali Tamposi, Amanda "Kiddo A.I." Ibanez, Billy Walsh, John Byron	Yes	Mikkel S. Eriksen, Tor Hermansen, Zegon, Laudz, Samuel Awuku, Ali Tamposi, Amanda "Kiddo A.I." Ibanez, Billy Walsh, John Byron
2025	Lisa	"Dream"	Alter Ego	Yes	Shintaro Yasuda, Her0ism, Feli Ferraro, Ali Tamposi	Yes	Shintaro Yasuda, Her0ism, Feli Ferraro, Ali Tamposi
2025	Maroon 5 and Lisa	"Priceless"	Love Is Like	Yes	Adam Levine, Sam Farrar, Ali Tamposi, Federico Vindver, Jacob Kasher Hindlin, Michael Pollack, Rhea Rajogopalan	Yes	Adam Levine, Sam Farrar, Ali Tamposi, Federico Vindver, Jacob Kasher Hindlin, Michael Pollack, Rhea Rajogopalan
2026	Blackpink	"Go"	Deadline	Yes	Rosé, Jennie, Jisoo, Chris Martin, Henry Walter, Danny Chung	No	N/A
2026	Anyma and Lisa	"Bad Angel"	Non-album single	Yes	Matteo Milleri, Matthew James Burns, Johannes Klahr, Michael Tucker, Nija Charles, Rogét Chahayed	Yes	Matteo Milleri, Matthew James Burns, Johannes Klahr, Michael Tucker, Nija Charles, Rogét Chahayed
2026	Lisa	"Sawadika"	Press Play	Yes	Thom Bridges, Mark Williams, Raul Cubina, Rachel West, Danny Chung	Yes	Thom Bridges, Mark Williams, Raul Cubina, Rachel West, Danny Chung
2026	Lisa	"V12"	Press Play	Yes	8AE, Dwayne Abernathy Jr., Jonathan Bach, Chris Collins, Claudia Valentina	Yes	8AE, Dwayne Abernathy Jr., Jonathan Bach, Chris Collins, Claudia Valentina
2026	Lisa	"Cobra"	Press Play	Yes	8AE, Isabelle Carlsson, Johnny Goldstein, Thomas Allen, Harold Brown, Morris Dickerson, Missy Elliott, Gerald Goldstein, Paul Huston, David Jolicoeur, Leroy Jordan, Lee Levitin, Kelvin Mercer, Charles Miller, Vincent Mason, Tim Mosley, Howard Scott	Yes	8AE, Isabelle Carlsson, Johnny Goldstein, Thomas Allen, Harold Brown, Morris Dickerson, Missy Elliott, Gerald Goldstein, Paul Huston, David Jolicoeur, Leroy Jordan, Lee Levitin, Kelvin Mercer, Charles Miller, Vincent Mason, Tim Mosley, Howard Scott
2026	Lisa	"Tarantino"	Press Play	Yes	Christian Astrop, Thom Bridges	Yes	Christian Astrop, Thom Bridges
2026	Lisa	"Cut U Off"	Press Play	Yes	8AE, Isabelle Carlsson, Helena Gao, Johnny Goldstein, Bernard Herrmann	Yes	8AE, Isabelle Carlsson, Helena Gao, Johnny Goldstein, Bernard Herrmann
2026	Lisa	"Sweat"	Press Play	Yes	8AE, Dan Farber, Helena Gao	Yes	8AE, Dan Farber, Helena Gao
2026	Lisa	"Leave with Me"	Non-album single	Yes	Ali Tamposi, Feli Ferraro, Shintaro Yasuda, Tyler Spry	Yes	Ali Tamposi, Feli Ferraro, Shintaro Yasuda, Tyler Spry

== Music videos ==
=== As lead artist ===
Title	Year	Director(s)	Length	Ref.
"Lalisa"	2021	Seo Hyun-seung	3:26	
"SG" (with DJ Snake, Ozuna and Megan Thee Stallion)	2021	Colin Tilley	4:01	
"Rockstar"	2024	Henry Scholfield	2:48	
"New Woman" (featuring Rosalía)	2024	Dave Meyers	3:12	
"Born Again" (featuring Doja Cat and Raye)	2025	Bardia Zeinali	4:04	
"Fxck Up the World" (Vixi solo version)	2025	Christian Breslauer	3:47	
"When I'm with You" (featuring Tyla)	2025	Olivia De Camps	3:11	
"Dream" (short film)	2025	Ojun Kwon	5:08	
"Bad Angel" (with Anyma)	2026	Gianluigi Carella	2:30	
"Goals" (with Anitta and Rema)	2026	Chris Villa	3:10	
"Sawadika"	2026	Bang Jae Yeob	3:06	
"Tarantino"	2026	James Mackel	3:37	
"Leave with Me"	2026	Sue Kim	3:02	

=== As featured artist ===
Title	Year	Director(s)	Length	Ref.
"Priceless" (Maroon 5 featuring Lisa)	2025	Aerin Morino	2:51	

=== Other videos ===
Title	Year	Director(s)	Length	Ref.
"Money" (exclusive performance video)	2021	Lee Sang-yoon	2:50	
"Shoong!" (performance video) (Taeyang featuring Lisa)	2023	GIGANT	3:29	
"Moonlit Floor (Kiss Me)" (performance video)	2024	Raja Virdi	2:37	
"Rapunzel (Kiki Solo Version)" (performance video)	2025	SAMSON	2:22	

== See also ==
- Blackpink discography
- List of artists who reached number one on the UK Singles Downloads Chart
- List of K-pop on the Billboard charts
