= Fxck Up the World =

Single by Lisa featuring Future

from the album Alter Ego
- A-side: "Rockstar"
- Released: February 28, 2025
- Genre: Trap
- Length: 3:04; 2:55 (Vixi solo version)
- Label: Lloud; RCA
- Songwriters: Lisa; Nayvadius Wilburn (Note: Future version); Jaeyoung Lee; Michael Mule; Isaac De Boni; Jacob Canady; Derrick Miller; Nija Charles
- Producers: FnZ; ATL Jacob; Hendrix Smoke

Lisa singles chronology
"Born Again" (2025)	"Fxck Up the World" (2025)	"Priceless" (2025)

Future singles chronology
"Loko" (2024)	"Fxck Up the World" (2025)	"Money on Money" (2025)

Music video
- "FUTW" (Vixi solo version) on YouTube

"Fxck Up the World" (also known as its acronym "FUTW") is a song by Thai rapper and singer Lisa featuring American rapper Future. It was released through Lloud and RCA Records on February 28, 2025, as the fifth single from Lisa's debut studio album, Alter Ego (2025). A hard-hitting trap song that introduces Lisa's villainous alter ego Vixi, it was written by the artists with Jaeyoung Lee, Derrick Miller, Nija Charles, FnZ and ATL Jacob while production was handled by the latter two and Hendrix Smoke. A version without Future titled the "Vixi solo version" was also included on the album.

"Fxck Up the World" received mixed reviews from critics, who praised its raucous energy while criticizing the lyrics. The song peaked at number two in Thailand, the top twenty in Malaysia and Singapore, and number 25 on the Billboard Global 200. An accompanying music video for the "Vixi solo version" was directed by Christian Breslauer and released on Lloud's YouTube channel simultaneously with the single's release. The video depicts Lisa in the role of Vixi escaping a mental institution and wreaking havoc citywide. Lisa performed the song at the Coachella Valley Music and Arts Festival and Blackpink's Deadline World Tour.

== Background and release ==
After departing from her label YG Entertainment for solo activities, Lisa founded her own artist management company called Lloud in February 2024. She subsequently signed with RCA Records in April to release solo music in partnership with Lloud. She released "Rockstar", "New Woman", "Moonlit Floor (Kiss Me)", and "Born Again" as the first four singles from her upcoming debut album through Lloud and RCA Records between June 2024 and February 2025. On November 19, 2024, she revealed the album's title Alter Ego and its release date of February 28, 2025. The reveal was accompanied by an album trailer video which featured Lisa portraying five different alter egos with snippets of different tracks played for each one; the last character was depicted walking down a volcanic red runway over the beat of a yet-to-be released track. Lisa revealed the alter ego's name, Vixi, and character description on February 12, 2025, which stated her song is named "Fxck Up the World". On February 21, Lisa posted a video revealing the album's tracklist, in which she takes a seat with her different alter egos over a snippet of the song. The tracklist included "Fxck Up the World" featuring American rapper Future as the album's sixth track, while a "Vixi solo version" of the song without Future was also included as the fourteenth track. "Fxck Up the World" was released as the fifth single and title track of Alter Ego alongside the album's release on February 28.

== Composition and lyrics ==
"Fxck Up the World" introduces listeners to Lisa's "fiercely independent and unpredictable" alter ego Vixi, who is "the one they love to call 'the villain.'" It is a "bold, declarative anthem" that promises to "shake things up and ensure Lisa gets the attention she feels she owed." Produced by ATL Jacob, it is a "hip-hop-leaning" song with a "trap-infused beat". Lisa raps alongside a guest verse from Future, with the hook being a repeated chant of "Let’s fuck up the world!"

== Critical reception ==
NME's Crystal Bell praised "Fxck Up the World" as "big, bold and undeniably in-your-face" and commended Lisa for sounding "completely in her element" and delivering her lines "with stylish, biting confidence". However, despite the track's "rowdy energy", Bell criticized the lyrics of the song for feeling like empty "corporate-speak" as well as Future's "throwaway verse". On the other hand, Shaad D'Souza of The Guardian felt that Future "tears through his guest verse" with his "growling and grunting" rap and that the song was "begging for placement in the trailer for an edgy mainstream action film". Writing for Billboard Philippines, Gabriel Saulog described the song as Alter Ego's "overdrive moment" and Lisa's "darkest and most edgy track to date" with potential to become one of the record's biggest hits, and praised ATL Jacob's production and Future's feature for adding "a whole lot of edge" to Lisa's expected sound. Similarly, Benjamin Lassy of The Daily Campus found it to be the song in which the album "kicks into gear" and lauded its "pounding base and outstanding vocal performance from Lisa", who "pushes this song further than most vocalists could take it." It was described as "raucous" by Rolling Stone's Maura Johnston and "quick and aggressive" with an "empowered message" similar to the hits of Lisa's group Blackpink by Elise Ryan for the Associated Press. Writing for Billboard, Eunbo Shim ranked "Fxck Up the World" as the ninth-best song on the album, calling it a "high-octane rallying cry" familiar to Blackpink fans that evokes the "rebellious spirit" of Arcane's Jinx. However, Pitchfork's Joshua Minsoo Kim negatively reviewed the "tedious" song as having no personality until Future's arrival, even with his "phoned-in verse", and described Lisa as channeling "second-rate Cardi B". Writing for The New York Times, Jon Caramanica named it a "messy collaboration" on which "Lisa’s gum-snapping tone feels airless and not fluid." Rhys Morgan of The Skinny noted the song's "vapid braggadocio" as an example of the album's "pop vacuity."

== Accolades ==
Awards and nominations for "Fxck Up the World"
Year	Organization	Award	Result	Ref.
2025	Berlin Commercial Festival	Craft: Editing	Nominated	

== Music video ==
A scene in the music video of Lisa's alter ego Vixi locked up in a mental institution.

An accompanying music video for the "Vixi solo version" of the song was directed by Christian Breslauer and uploaded to Lloud's YouTube channel simultaneously with the single's release. Before its release, Lisa teased it with a teaser video on February 27 in which she was shown in a padded room with a sinister smile. In the music video, Lisa portrays her alter ego Vixi. Vixi is held in a holding cell at a mental institution before breaking out and going on a citywide rampage in a night filled with video games, dancing, and joyriding. The video also shows animated glimpses of Lisa's other alter egos.

== Live performances ==
On March 18, Lisa released a YouTube Music Nights Special Stage Performance video for "Fxck Up the World". In the video, she and six backup dancers perform wearing black leather bikinis on a stage framed by red columns. She also performed the song at the Coachella Valley Music and Arts Festival on April 11 and 18, 2025. Beginning on July 12, "Fxck Up the World" was included on the setlist as part of Lisa's solo stage during Blackpink's Deadline World Tour. Lisa included "Fxck Up the World" on the setlist of her concert residency Viva La Lisa, which ran from November 12 to 29, 2026 in Las Vegas.

== Credits and personnel ==
Credits adapted from the liner notes of Alter Ego and Tidal.

- Lisa – vocals, songwriter
- Future – featured vocals, songwriter (Future version)
- ATL Jacob – songwriter, producer
- FnZ – producer
  - Michael Mule – songwriter
  - Isaac De Boni – songwriter
- Derrick Miller – songwriter
- Nija Charles – songwriter
- Jaeyoung Lee – songwriter, gang vocals
- Hendrix Smoke – producer
- JJ Joe – gang vocals
- Alice Kang – gang vocals
- Chase Johnson – gang vocals
- Tonianne Tartaro – gang vocals
- Chloe Weise Donovan – gang vocals
- Kuk Harrell – vocal producer, gang vocals
- Jelli Dorman – vocal engineer
- Miguel "Wav Surgeon" Correa – vocal engineer (Future version)
- Chad "KM" Kitchens – additional engineer
- Patrizio “Teezio” Pigliapoco – mix engineer
- Ignacio Portales – mix assistant
- Federico Giordano – mix assistant
- Randy Merrill – mastering engineer

== Charts ==
Chart performance for "Fxck Up the World"
Chart (2025)	Peak position
Canada Hot 100 (Billboard)	85
China (TME Korean)	21
Global 200 (Billboard)	25
Malaysia (IFPI)	18
Netherlands (Global Top 40)	22
New Zealand Hot Singles (RMNZ)	4
Nicaragua Anglo Airplay (Monitor Latino)	3
Peru Anglo Airplay (Monitor Latino)	17
Philippines Hot 100 (Billboard Philippines)	32
Portugal (AFP)	173
Singapore (RIAS)	12
South Korea Download (Circle)	62
Thailand (IFPI)	2
UK Singles Downloads (Official Charts)	96
US Bubbling Under Hot 100 (Billboard)	6
US Hot R&B/Hip-Hop Songs (Billboard)	36

== Release history ==
Release dates and formats for "Fxck Up the World"
Region	Date	Format	Label	Ref.
Various	February 28, 2025	Digital download; streaming	Lloud; RCA	
