= Deadline World Tour =

2025–2026 concert tour by Blackpink

- World tour by Blackpink
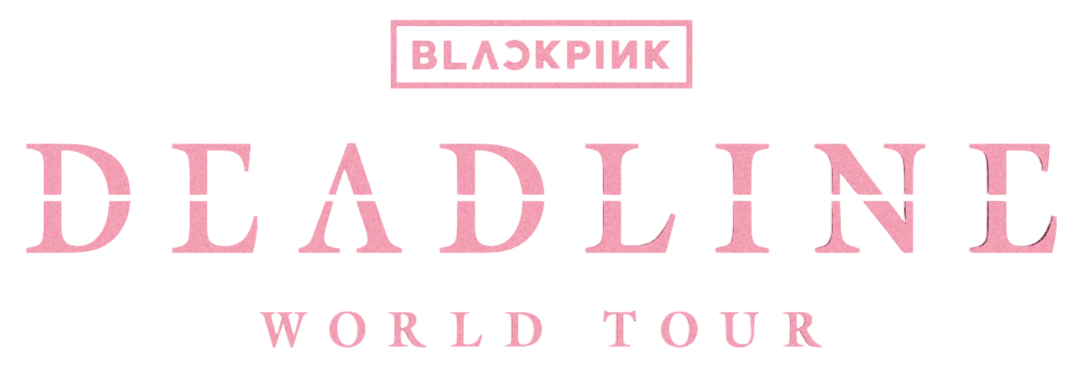
- Tour logo
- Location: Asia; Europe; North America
- Associated album: Deadline (Note: The tour promoted the EP's lead single "Jump" and led into the EP's release in February 2026.)
- Start date: July 5, 2025
- End date: January 26, 2026
- No. of shows: 33

Blackpink concert chronology
- Born Pink World Tour (2022–2023); Deadline World Tour (2025–2026)

The Deadline World Tour was the third worldwide concert tour and the fourth overall by South Korean girl group Blackpink in support of their third Korean extended play Deadline (2026). Marketed as the group's first all-stadium tour, (Note: Despite being included as a venue on an all-stadium tour, the Philippine Arena is not a stadium but possesses a stadium-like maximum capacity of 55,000, as the world's largest indoor arena.) it commenced on July 5, 2025, at the Goyang Stadium in South Korea, and concluded on January 26, 2026, at the Kai Tak Stadium in Hong Kong.

== Background and promotion ==
On February 5, 2025, Blackpink previewed their upcoming tour via their social media accounts. Limited details were provided at the time, with the group releasing only a brief teaser video. The clip featured fans cheering in large venues, the four members performing on stage, and ended with the message "2025 World Tour" in pink text on a black background. Two weeks later on February 19, YG Entertainment unveiled a poster for a 10-city stadium tour with 13 dates, with shows across South Korea, North America, and Europe.

On May 16, Blackpink announced Deadline World Tour as the tour's official title. A 30-second teaser video showing the tour logo emerging from a pool of pink glitter was released on May 23. On May 27, YG Entertainment announced dates for the Asia leg of the tour. On June 23, the label confirmed Blackpink will debut their comeback single at the tour's first show in Goyang.

On June 26, a teaser for the tour was released on various social media platforms. The trailer started off with one member at a phone booth, then showcased each member individually, and eventually all four in a pink convertible car. It then promptly ended with the phone dangling from its hook. A few days later, they released a 'Pink Zone' map in Seoul, hinting at events coinciding with the tour.

=== Collaborations ===
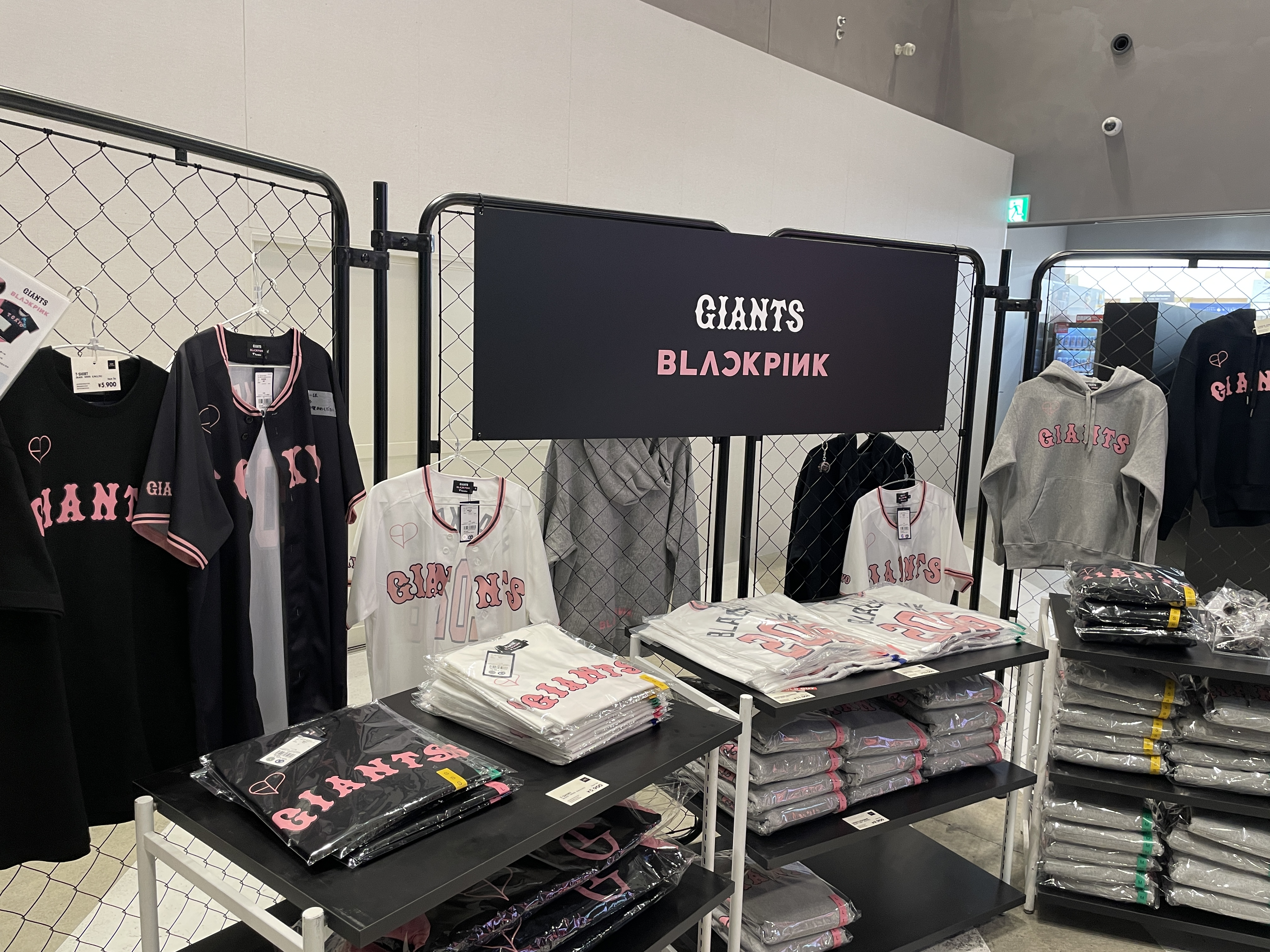
A pop-up store held for the Deadline World Tour in Miyashita Park, Japan

On July 12, 2025, Google announced a global partnership with Blackpink to provide fans with concert venue information, as well as tailored Google Maps-related features, for easier access to the tour and its surrounding attractions.

During the US leg of the tour, Blackpink collaborated with American sports retail brand Fanatics, media company Complex, and clothing brand Mitchell & Ness to release the Blackpink In Your Area League Collection, which features exclusive NBA and MLB-themed apparel designed with "Blackpink's signature flair" for seven "iconic" teams: the Los Angeles Lakers, Los Angeles Dodgers, Chicago Bulls, Chicago Cubs, Chicago White Sox, New York Knicks, and New York Mets. The collection was made available on the brands' official online stores, as well as in Fanatics x Complex pop-up stores in Los Angeles and New York from July 11–13 and July 25–27, respectively.

On July 28, French football club Paris Saint-Germain announced a limited-edition merchandise collaboration with Blackpink. The PSG x Blackpink capsule collection includes co-branded t-shirts and hoodies in pink and black. The collection was released on July 30, ahead of the concerts in Paris on August 2 and 3, which mark the beginning of the European leg of the tour.

== Concert synopsis ==
The show begins with an introduction video of Rosé driving a vintage Buick throughout the city of Los Angeles, picking up each of the other girls on their way to Las Vegas. Blackpink opens the show with "Kill This Love", followed by "Pink Venom" and "How You Like That". They perform "Playing with Fire" as each member stands in front of their own moving screen to perform their verse with their face projected onto the large screens behind them, and finally "Shut Down" before exiting the stage.

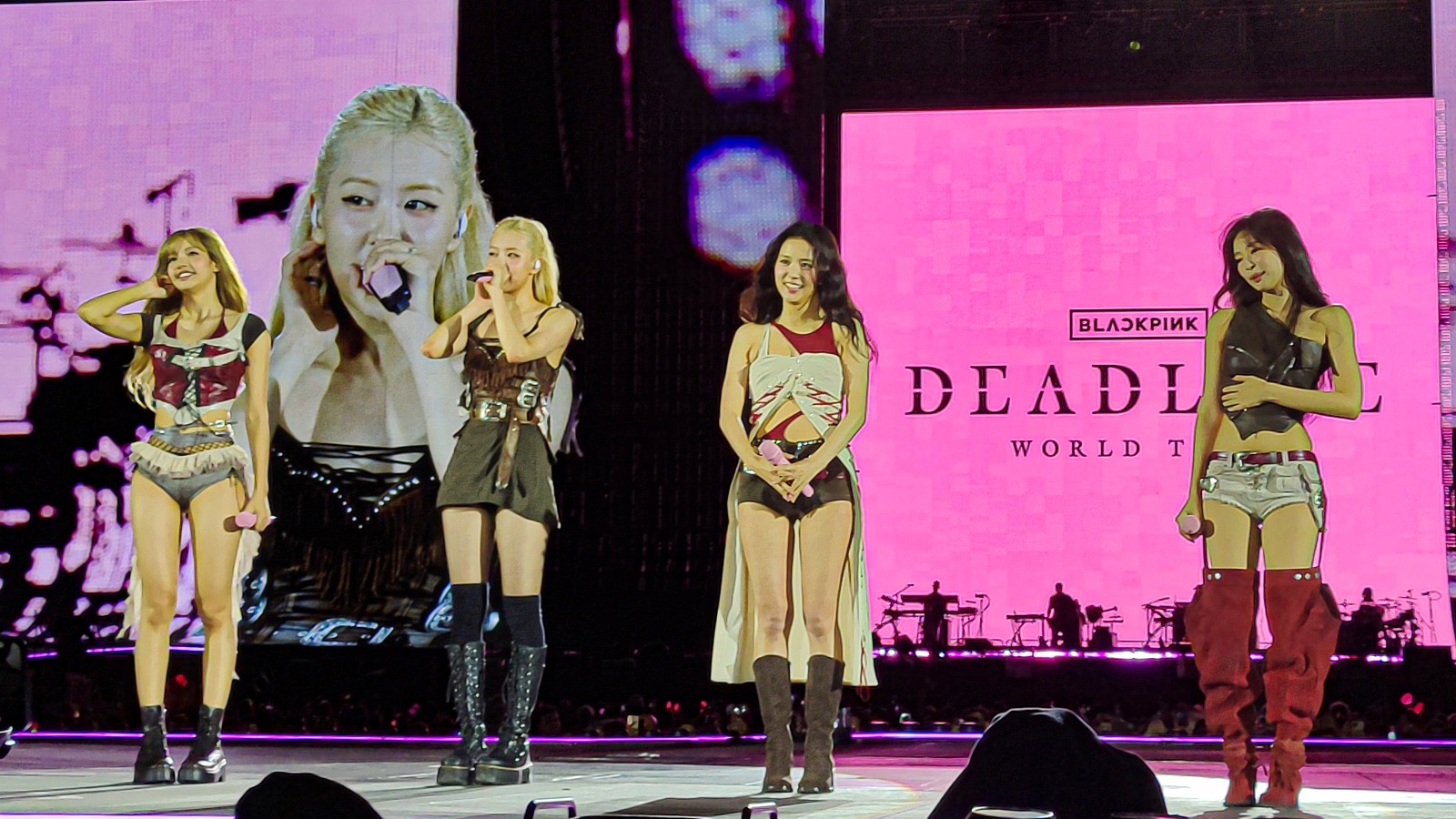
Blackpink performing in Milan, Italy in August 2025

An interlude segment with imagery of neon Las Vegas signs begins the second act, which consists of solo sets by Jisoo and Lisa. Jisoo plays a mashup of "Earthquake" surrounded by 20 dancers before going into sexy chair choreography for "Your Love" as confetti rains on the crowd. Then, Lisa takes the stage for two songs, initially "New Woman" and "Rockstar" before it was changed to "Thunder" and "Fxck Up the World". For the third act, an interlude video shows the Blackpink members cruising down a highway in their car before the group returns on stage. They perform "Pretty Savage" as Rosé introduces the members of their live band, and go on to perform "Don't Know What to Do", "Whistle", "Stay", and "Lovesick Girls".

Another interlude depicting Blackpink stranded in the desert with their car broken down is played before the fourth act, which features solo sets by Jennie and Rosé. Jennie leads with a medley of "Mantra" and "With the IE (Way Up)" and closes with "Like Jennie". For Rosé's segment, she tries a signature snack or dish from each city as she hops onto the trapdoor lift to take the stage. She performs "3am" in an intimate performance where she shares the story behind the song as she interacts with the crowd. She concludes her solo segment of the show by playing "APT.". The show's final act opens with a laser-heavy performance of "Jump" in Western-inspired outfits, bringing to life the desert aesthetic of the interludes. It is followed by performances of "Boombayah", "Ddu-Du Ddu-Du", "As If It's Your Last", and ending with "Forever Young". For the encore, Blackpink returns on stage to perform a select few songs, with a tradition of ending the show with one of their solo songs as a group.

== Reception ==
The tour generally received positive reviews from critics. The Standard's Ali Shutler scored the concert a perfect five-star rating, declaring that "the world's biggest girl group are at the top of their game". Writing for the Toronto Star, Hannah Sung scored the concert three and a half out of four stars, likewise remarking on the "spectacle" and the group being "absolutely at the top of their game, weaving hit after hit into a tight set list built into five acts plus an encore".

Tómas Mier of Rolling Stone praised the tour as a "triumphant" and "high-voltage homecoming", further describing the show to be filled with "the kind of poptimism and electric choreography we’ve come to expect from the greatest girl group of this generation". He further observed that the growth that each of the Blackpink members has achieved amidst their individual activities since the Born Pink World Tour has allowed the group to "work even better". In agreement, The Hollywood Reporter's Nicole Fell complimented the inclusion of the members' solo sets, stating that "each solo section skillfully conveyed the notion that performing as solo singers has only improved their skills and chemistry as a group".

In a more mixed review, The Guardian's Adrian Horton rated the concert three out of five stars, praising Blackpink for their "high-octane delights" but noting that the group's New York performance was less powerful compared to those of their previous events. She also remarked on the members' lack of precise execution of their solo sets, observing that it was their combined strengths that served as a shield for their individual weaknesses: "Individually, they are pop artists in a crowded field, each neutralized and overwhelmed by the familiar elements around them. Together, they steamroll."

=== Accolades ===
Year	Ceremony	Category	Result	Ref.
2026	iHeartRadio Music Awards	Favorite Tour Style	Nominated	

== Commercial performance ==
Tickets for the European and North American concerts went on sale on February 27. Due to anticipated demand, two additional shows were announced, one for each venue at Wembley Stadium in London and Stade de France in Paris. Two additional shows were also announced for Citi Field in New York City, Rogers Stadium in Toronto, and SoFi Stadium in Los Angeles due to the North American shows selling out.

On May 15, 2025, all tickets for the two shows at Goyang Stadium were sold out shortly after they were released. Limited-view seats were then made available on May 22 to meet high demand.

== Set list ==
This set list is from the July 5, 2025, concert in Goyang. It does not represent all shows throughout the tour.

Act 1

1. "Kill This Love"
2. "Pink Venom"
3. "How You Like That"
4. "Playing with Fire"
5. "Shut Down"

Act 2

6. "Earthquake" (Jisoo solo)
7. "Your Love" (Jisoo solo)
8. "New Woman" (Lisa solo)
9. "Rockstar" (Lisa solo)

Act 3

10. "Pretty Savage"
11. "Don't Know What to Do"
12. "Whistle"
13. "Stay"
14. "Lovesick Girls"

Act 4

15. "Mantra" (Jennie solo)
16. "With the IE (Way Up)" (Jennie solo)
17. "Like Jennie" (Jennie solo)
18. "3am" (Rosé solo)
19. "Toxic Till the End" (Rosé solo)
20. "Apt." (Rosé solo)

Act 5

21. "Jump"
22. "Boombayah"
23. "Ddu-Du Ddu-Du"
24. "As If It's Your Last"
25. "Forever Young"

Encore

26. "Jump" (reprise)
27. "See U Later"

=== Alterations and notes ===
- Beginning on the July 12, 2025, concert in Inglewood, Lisa performs "Thunder" and "Fxck Up the World" in place of "New Woman" and "Rockstar", respectively, and "Really" was added to the encore set list, succeeding the reprisal of "Jump".
- During the July 13, 2025, concert in Inglewood, Bruno Mars performed "Apt." with Rosé.
- During the July 22, 2025, concert in Toronto, Blackpink performed a reprisal of "Apt." during the encore in place of "See U Later".
- During the July 23, 2025, concert in Toronto, Blackpink performed "Fxck Up the World" during the encore.
- During the July 26, 2025, concert in New York, Blackpink performed a reprisal of "Earthquake" during the encore. Beginning with this date, Rosé performed "Two Years" in place of "3am".
- During the July 27, 2025, concert in New York, Blackpink performed a reprisal of "Like Jennie" during the encore.
- During the August 2, 2025, concert in Saint-Denis, Jisoo performed the English version of "Earthquake". Beginning with this date, Jennie performed "Handlebars" in place of "Mantra", and "Kick It" was added to the encore set list, in place of "See U Later".
- During the August 9, 2025, concert in Barcelona, Rosé performed "Call It the End" in place of "3am".
- During the August 15, 2025, concert in London, Lisa performed "Thunder", "Lifestyle", and "Rockstar" for her solo set; Rosé performed "Dance All Night" in place of "3am"; and "Yeah Yeah Yeah" was added to the encore set list in place of "Really".
- During the August 16, 2025, concert in London, Lisa performed "Thunder", "Lifestyle", and "Rockstar" for her solo set; and Blackpink performed "Wannabe" by the Spice Girls during the encore.
- During the October 18 and October 19, 2025, concerts in Kaohsiung, Jisoo replaced "Your Love" with "Hugs & Kisses", and Lisa performed "Rockstar", "When I'm with You", and "Thunder" for her solo set. The encore was updated to include "See U Later" and "Kick It" succeeding the reprisal of "Jump".

== Tour dates ==
List of 2025 concerts
Date (2025)	City	Country	Venue	Attendance	Revenue
July 5	Goyang	South Korea	Goyang Stadium	78,000	—
July 6	Goyang	South Korea	Goyang Stadium	78,000	—
July 12	Inglewood (Note: Labeled as Los Angeles in promotional material.)	United States	SoFi Stadium	100,000	—
July 13	Inglewood	United States	SoFi Stadium	100,000	—
July 18	Chicago	United States	Soldier Field	50,000	—
July 22	Toronto	Canada	Rogers Stadium	100,000	—
July 23	Toronto	Canada	Rogers Stadium	100,000	—
July 26	New York City	United States	Citi Field	40,000	—
July 27	New York City	United States	Citi Field	—	—
August 2	Saint-Denis (Note: Labeled as Paris in promotional material.)	France	Stade de France	110,000	—
August 3	Saint-Denis	France	Stade de France	110,000	—
August 6	Milan	Italy	Ippodromo La Maura	50,000	—
August 9	Barcelona	Spain	Estadi Olímpic Lluís Companys	51,000	—
August 15	London	England	Wembley Stadium	110,000	—
August 16	London	England	Wembley Stadium	110,000	—
October 18	Kaohsiung	Taiwan	Kaohsiung National Stadium	100,000	—
October 19	Kaohsiung	Taiwan	Kaohsiung National Stadium	100,000	—
October 24	Bangkok	Thailand	Rajamangala National Stadium	—	—
October 25	Bangkok	Thailand	Rajamangala National Stadium	—	—
October 26	Bangkok	Thailand	Rajamangala National Stadium	—	—
November 1	Jakarta	Indonesia	Gelora Bung Karno Main Stadium	—	—
November 2	Jakarta	Indonesia	Gelora Bung Karno Main Stadium	—	—
November 22	Bocaue (Note: Labeled as Bulacan in promotional material.)	Philippines	Philippine Arena	—	—
November 23	Bocaue	Philippines	Philippine Arena	—	—
November 28	Singapore		Singapore National Stadium	150,000	—
November 29	Singapore		Singapore National Stadium	150,000	—
November 30	Singapore		Singapore National Stadium	150,000	—

List of 2026 concerts
Date (2026)	City	Country	Venue	Attendance	Revenue
January 16	Tokyo	Japan	Tokyo Dome	165,000	—
January 17	Tokyo	Japan	Tokyo Dome	165,000	—
January 18	Tokyo	Japan	Tokyo Dome	165,000	—
January 24	Hong Kong		Kai Tak Stadium	137,616	$29,193,965
January 25	Hong Kong		Kai Tak Stadium	137,616	$29,193,965
January 26	Hong Kong		Kai Tak Stadium	137,616	$29,193,965
Total				—	—
