= Dream (Lisa song) =

- Poster for the short film

Song by Lisa

from the album Alter Ego
- Released: February 28, 2025
- Genre: Ballad
- Length: 3:43
- Label: Lloud; RCA
- Songwriters: Lisa; Shintaro Yasuda; her0ism; Felicia Ferraro; Ali Tamposi
- Producers: Shintaro Yasuda; her0ism

Short film
- "Dream" on YouTube

"Dream" is a song by Thai rapper and singer Lisa. It was released through Lloud and RCA Records on February 28, 2025, as a track on Lisa's debut studio album, Alter Ego (2025). Written by Lisa with Felicia Ferraro, Ali Tamposi and the song's producers Shintaro Yasuda and her0ism, it is a ballad with vulnerable lyrics about a past heartbreak. Following its release, the song became Lisa's second number-one hit on the Official Thailand Chart after "Born Again".

An accompanying short film starring Lisa and Japanese actor Kentaro Sakaguchi was directed by Ojun Kwon and premiered on August 13. It depicts Lisa mourning the death of her lover, portrayed by Sakaguchi, and reminiscing about their past together. The short film won Best Pop at the 2026 MTV Video Music Awards, making Lisa the first K-pop soloist to win the category.

== Background and release ==
After departing from her label YG Entertainment for solo activities, Lisa founded her own artist management company called Lloud in February 2024. She subsequently signed with RCA Records in April to release solo music in partnership with Lloud. On November 19, Lisa announced her debut studio album, Alter Ego (2025). Lisa posted the album's tracklist on February 21, 2025, which included "Dream" as the album's thirteenth track. The song was released alongside the album on February 28, 2025.

On August 1, Lisa posted a scenic photo using "Dream" as the background music. On August 4, a photo of Lisa appearing to bite someone’s arm, while surrounded by a production team, was posted on Lloud's social media, also including audio from the song. Days later on August 6, Japanese actor Kentaro Sakaguchi shared a similar photo of scenery on his Instagram Stories with the same song playing. The next day, Lisa posted a behind-the-scenes still from a music video shoot showing two hands exchanging rings. On August 11, she officially announced the premiere of a short film for "Dream" starring Lisa and Sakaguchi for release on August 13 with a first look showing the two in a black-and-white embrace.

== Composition and lyrics ==
"Dream" was written by Lisa with the song's producers Shintaro Yasuda and her0ism as well as Felicia Ferraro and Ali Tamposi. The lone ballad on Alter Ego, the song's vulnerable lyrics, soft vocals, and "lullaby-esque" production stands out for showing a rare glimpse of the real Lisa outside of her alter egos. She sings candidly about a past heartbreak that she misses deeply and how she hopes for a future where they can reconnect, even just as friends. In her 2026 documentary film Always Lalisa, Lisa divulged that "Dream" was written about a past relationship that she had kept private and that she sought the person's approval before releasing the song.

Over a "sparse but sparkling keyboard", Lisa sings a series of questions to her ex in the first chorus: "Are you happy? Are you sad? / Are you always gonna hate me for that night in Tokyo?" She explains that at the time of the split she "hoped that it’d be open-ended," but in fact was firmly closed. In a "lush chorus filled with heavenly synths", Lisa wistfully reminisces and shares that she has "Been drowning in dreams lately / Like it’s 2019, baby," adding a timestamp to the relationship. However, she realizes her dreams are an impossible fantasy in the chorus' final line, singing "If all that we were is all that we’ll ever be / It’s bittersweet / At least a girl can dream." A "snapping beat" drops in the second verse as Lisa desperately attempts to glean anything from her ex's friends. In the bridge, she accepts that the dreamed reunion is "only in my mind" but can't help but pretend, putting "makeup on just to fall asleep" and "playin’ three nights on the stereo," speculated to be a reference to "3 Nights" by Dominic Fike. Lisa understands by the final chorus that she can't live in her dreams and ends with the heartbreaking question "Can we be friends at least?"

== Critical reception ==
Writing for Billboard, Eunbo Shim ranked "Dream" as the tenth-best song on the album, praising how it highlights "Lisa's raw, emotive vocals" and closes Alter Ego on a vulnerable, yet hauntingly tender note." Likewise, Gabriel Saulog wrote for Billboard Philippines that the song impressed lyrically and sonically compared to earlier tracks and showed Lisa's "vocal capabilities shining more so than we’ve ever heard them before." Benjamin Lassy of The Daily Campus called it a "beautiful track" with breaks in the mix that "give the song time to breathe and carefully beckon Lisa’s vocals to flow in with wonderful delivery," adding that "albums rarely end on a note as sublime as this." The Irish Times's Ed Power described "Dream" as a "Billie Eilish-style hazy ballad that strips away the overkill and showcases Lisa’s hauntingly expressive voice", while The New York Times's Jon Caramanica opined that Lisa sounded the "most comfortable" on the "straightforward ballad".

On the other hand, Shaad D'Souza of The Guardian found the song to be "laughably out of character" following an album of hard-hitting raps and felt that it demonstrated Lisa's "blunt" and "out of date" viewpoint of genre, solely using ballads for soft emotions and rap for aggression. Pitchfork's Joshua Minsoo Kim similarly negatively reviewed "Dream" as a "shallow ballad that can’t help but feel flimsy, rushing through lines to eschew any meaningful pathos".

== Accolades ==
"Dream" won Best Pop at the 2026 MTV Video Music Awards, making Lisa the first K-pop soloist to win the category.

Awards and nominations for "Dream"
Year	Organization	Award	Result	Ref.
2025	Asian Pop Music Awards	Best Music Video	Nominated	
2026	BreakTudo Awards	International Music Video	Pending	
2026	MTV Video Music Awards	Best Pop	Won	
2026	MTV Video Music Awards	Best Cinematography	Nominated	
2026	MTV Video Music Awards	Best Editing	Nominated	
2026	MTV Video Music Awards	Best K-Pop	Nominated	

== Short film ==
An accompanying short film for "Dream" was directed by Ojun Kwon and premiered on August 13, 2025 at 11 PM EDT. Running for five minutes in length, the film stars Lisa and Japanese actor Kentaro Sakaguchi in an "emotional, beautiful story". Before its release, Lisa shared a short teaser clip of the film on August 12.

=== Synopsis ===
The short film opens with a scene of Lisa in mourning as she approaches the casket of her dead lover, whom she sees seemingly walking through the door. Lisa and her lover then embark on a road trip before taking a midnight stop at a gas station, where the latter hands over the car keys for Lisa to drive. A black-and-white montage of the couple's happier days plays, showcasing them laughing and dancing together. During another stop, Lisa walks over to the passenger side of the car, revealing a metallic urn in place of her dead lover. As she rows out alone with the urn to the middle of a lake, she recalls a conversation where she asks her lover about his dreams for the next life, only for her lover to ask her the question in return. When she responds that she would want to be a tree, her lover answers that he would want to be a lake that would reflect the tree's beauty. Hugging the urn in grief, Lisa finally spreads a handful of her lover's ashes onto the water.

== Live performances ==
Lisa performed "Dream" live for the first time at the Coachella Valley Music and Arts Festival on April 11 and 18, 2025. She included the song on the setlist of her concert residency Viva La Lisa, which ran from November 12 to 29, 2026 in Las Vegas.

== Credits and personnel ==
Credits adapted from the liner notes of Alter Ego.

Recording

- Mixed at Mountainroad Studios (Zurich, Switzerland)

Personnel

- Lisa – vocals, songwriter
- Shintaro Yasuda – songwriter, producer
- her0ism – songwriter, producer
- Felicia Ferraro – songwriter
- Ali Tamposi – songwriter
- Kuk Harrell – vocal producer
- Jelli Dorman – vocal engineer
- Serge Courtois – mix engineer

== Charts ==
Chart performance for "Dream"
Chart (2025)	Peak position
China (TME Korean)	32
Global Excl. US (Billboard)	122
Japan Heatseekers Songs (Billboard Japan)	16
Japan Hot Shot Songs (Billboard Japan)	20
Malaysia (Billboard)	25
Malaysia International (RIM)	13
Thailand (IFPI)	1
Vietnam (Vietnam Hot 100)	17

== See also ==
- List of K-pop songs on the Billboard charts
- List of number-one songs (Thailand)
