= Born Again (Lisa song) =

Single by Lisa featuring Doja Cat and Raye

from the album Alter Ego
- Released: February 6, 2025
- Genre: Pop; electropop; disco
- Length: 3:51
- Label: Lloud; RCA
- Songwriters: Rachel Keen; Amala Zandile Dlamini; Andrew Wells; Anthony Rossomando
- Producers: Raye; Andrew Wells

Lisa singles chronology
"Moonlit Floor (Kiss Me)" (2024)	"Born Again" (2025)	"Fxck Up the World" (2025)

Doja Cat singles chronology
"Okloser" (2024)	"Born Again" (2025)	"Just Us" (2025)

Raye singles chronology
"Oscar Winning Tears" (2024)	"Born Again" (2025)	"Suzanne" (2025)

Music video
- "Born Again" on YouTube

"Born Again" is a song by Thai rapper and singer Lisa featuring American rapper and singer Doja Cat and British singer-songwriter Raye. It was released through Lloud and RCA Records on February 6, 2025, as the fourth single from Lisa's debut studio album, Alter Ego (2025). A pop song incorporating disco and electropop elements, it was written by its producers Raye and Andrew Wells as well as Doja Cat and Anthony Rossomando. It is a post-breakup empowerment anthem in which the artists reflect on a failed relationship.

Music critics praised "Born Again" as a standout album opener due to its dynamic production and the artists' vocals. The song debuted at number one on the Official Thailand Chart, becoming Lisa's first chart-topper in her native country. In the United Kingdom, it peaked at number 13 on the UK Singles Chart and was certified silver by the British Phonographic Industry (BPI). The song peaked at number 22 on the Billboard Global 200 and became Lisa's fifth and highest-charting entry on the US Billboard Hot 100 at number 68. It also reached the top twenty in some Asian countries and the top seventy in some European and Oceanian countries, including Germany, Australia, Canada, Ireland and France.

An accompanying music video was directed by Bardia Zeinali and released on Lloud's YouTube channel simultaneously with the single's release. The video pays tribute to powerful women throughout history and depicts the three artists singing in mourning attire before transitioning into medieval warriors, symbolizing their personal growth. Lisa performed "Born Again" at the Coachella Valley Music and Arts Festival and appeared at the 97th Academy Awards with Doja Cat and Raye. The song won Best K-Pop at the 2025 MTV Video Music Awards, making Lisa tied as the most-awarded artist in the category.

== Background and release ==
After departing from her label YG Entertainment for solo activities, Lisa established her own artist management company called Lloud in February 2024 and signed with RCA Records to release solo music in partnership with Lloud in April. She released "Rockstar", "New Woman", and "Moonlit Floor (Kiss Me)" as the first three singles from her upcoming debut album, Alter Ego, through Lloud and RCA Records between June and October 2024. In an October interview with Audacy, Lisa expressed that working with Doja Cat was her "next goal". In January 2025, she teased in an episode of NRJ that her upcoming single would be a collaboration with an artist she had previously mentioned wanting to work with.

On January 24, Lisa, Doja Cat, and Raye shared a photograph of themselves posing together in glamorous black cocktail dresses on Instagram and announced their collaboration on a single titled "Born Again", due for release on February 6 at 7 p.m. ET. Lisa posted several TikTok videos with a short snippet of the song’s hook, including a video where she poses with a billboard promoting Alter Ego. On February 3, she released the official cover art for the single, which shows the three artists in black gowns within a frame at the center of the page, with Doja looking down and Lisa and Raye staring into the camera. The song featured before its release in a trailer for the third season of the HBO television series The White Lotus starring Lisa.

== Composition and lyrics ==
Almost four minutes in length, "Born Again" features production by Andrew Wells and Raye herself. A demo version of the song by Raye previously leaked when she left her former label Polydor Records in 2021. It has been described a "disco-tinged", "dynamic and energetic pop song" that "folds in bits of electro-pop." The production was described as a "springy, amped-up bassline" that "taps into 80s disco sleaze" and uses "synths, claps, drum pads and bongo samples" continually blending into the mix with no gaps in the instrumentation. Lisa and Raye alternate singing during the first verse and chorus, after which Doja drops a verse.

The title "Born Again" is a meta reference that declares Lisa's rebirth as a solo artist. It is a breakup empowerment song in which the three artists each detail what their ex-lover lost by giving up on their relationship. They taunt their former partners by boasting about their glow-ups since their relationships' dissolutions. In the first verse, Lisa sings about breaking up "with my man like mm-hmm (A very, very silly, silly man) / One ex in the passenger seat 'cause I'm done." The track leans into religious themes to describe a feeling of post-breakup clarity and empowerment. In the chorus, they mock their exes for fumbling a divine experience: "If you tried just a little more times / I would've made you a believer / Would've showed you what it's like / Every single night / To be born again, baby, to be born again." Doja Cat continues to taunt her ex in her half-sung/half-rapped verse, stating "I hope you learned somethin' from a lil' fiasco / You played the game smart, lettin' lil' me pass go." While Lisa's verse uses the metaphor of speeding away from a failed relationship, Doja Cat and Raye's verses heavily incorporate religious iconography. Doja Cat references the apple in the Garden of Eden in the lines "Non-believer / You’ve bitten from the fruit but can't give back / Nice to leave ya / But I would be a fool not to ask / Do your words seem gospel to ya now?" For her bridge, Raye brings up prayer and says "I'm only gonna make you need religion at the minimum", coming to the conclusion that she had to end a relationship to "save my soul."

== Critical reception ==
Professional ratings
Review scores
Source	Rating
IZM	2.5/5 stars

Writing for Billboard Philippines, Gabriel Saulog commended "Born Again" as "an impactful and soaring introduction" to the album due to the artists' "undeniable chemistry and flow" and added that it delivers a completely new sound unheard of from Lisa or her group Blackpink. Eunbo Shim of Billboard ranked it the third-best song on the album, calling it a "bold and defiant statement" with its disco production and meta title, and found the lyrics' religious connotations to channel '80s Madonna. NME's Crystal Bell described that the "sultry" track "finds Lisa flexing her nimble vocals." While Elise Ryan of the Associated Press dubbed it "lush" and The Irish Times's Ed Power called it "beautifully punchy", Benjamin Lassy of The Daily Campus lauded the song as "superb", "almost spiritual" and a "beautiful and vulnerable cut", pointing to how "Lisa's vocals soar over an orchestration while a stellar slap base kicks off the album with an indelible groove." Likewise, Maura Johnston of Rolling Stone commended "Born Again" for blending the "sort of light blasphemy that would make Madonna proud" with a "modern take on Latin freestyle" and praised the artists for "fully leaning into the lyrics’ sauciness." Writing for The Skinny, Rhys Morgan highlighted the song as a standout that "pulses with warmth and groove that would seamlessly sit alongside anything on Dua Lipa's Future Nostalgia, with a bassline fit for Justice's Woman." Joshua Minsoo Kim of Pitchfork made a similar comparison in his negative review, deriding the song as a "banal disco track in the vein of Dua Lipa" that failed to "understand how a voice can be a vessel for exultant uplift."

== Accolades ==
Lisa earned her third win for Best K-Pop at the MTV Video Music Awards for "Born Again", making her tied with BTS as the most-awarded artist in the category.

Awards and nominations for "Born Again"
Year	Organization	Award	Result	Ref.
2025	Asian Pop Music Awards	Record of the Year	Nominated	
2025	BreakTudo Awards	International Collaboration of the Year	Nominated	
2025	MTV Video Music Awards	Best K-Pop	Won	
2026	Berlin Music Video Awards	Best Editor (Note: Editors: Troy Charbonnet and Modern Post)	Nominated	
2026	iHeartRadio Music Awards	Best Music Video	Nominated	
2026	iHeartRadio Music Awards	Favorite K-pop Collab	Nominated	

== Music video ==
A scene in the music video of Lisa, Doja Cat, and Raye reborn as medieval warriors, symbolizing their empowerment from personal growth.

An accompanying music video for "Born Again" was uploaded to Lloud's YouTube channel simultaneously with the single's release. It was directed by Bardia Zeinali and divided into four parts. A behind-the-scenes clip of its filming was later released on February 19, showing the three artists having fun throughout the ten-hour shoot. The video contains references to various religions, mythologies, historical figures, including Joan of Arc, Cleopatra, and Eve, as well as events, such as the Salem Witch Trials. On Instagram, Lisa shared: "This video is a tribute to powerful women throughout history and to all of you."

The music video begins with a shot of a grandfather clock ticking backwards, followed by a display of text defining the song’s title as "the transformation into a New Woman who embraces her freedom to become the person she desires to be." Lisa, Doja, and Raye are then introduced perched on an ornate gold sofa set in a black-and-white room, wearing glamorous all-black outfits. They sing lyrics as they lounge together in the living room space of a sleek mansion. Initially dressed in black mourning gowns, the trio shed their past selves and emerge in ethereal white dresses accented with pieces of silver armor. This transformation into medieval warriors conveys the song's theme of self-reinvention and symbolizes their strength and empowerment from personal growth.

== Live performances ==
Despite being expected, Lisa, Doja Cat and Raye did not sing "Born Again" during their joint performance at the 97th Academy Awards, but instead performed a James Bond musical tribute. Lisa performed "Born Again" for the first time at the Coachella Valley Music and Arts Festival on April 11 and 18, 2025. She included "Born Again" on the setlist of her concert residency Viva La Lisa, which ran from November 12 to 29, 2026 in Las Vegas.

== Track listing ==
- Digital download and streaming
1. "Born Again" (featuring Doja Cat and Raye) – 3:51
- Digital download and streaming – Purple Disco Machine remix
1. "Born Again" (featuring Doja Cat and Raye; Purple Disco Machine remix) – 3:32
2. "Born Again" (featuring Doja Cat and Raye; Purple Disco Machine extended mix) – 5:08
3. "Born Again" (featuring Doja Cat and Raye) – 3:51

== Personnel ==
Credits adapted from Melon and Apple Music.

- Lisa – vocals
- Raye – vocals, lyrics, composition, production
- Doja Cat – vocals, lyrics, composition
- Andrew Wells – lyrics, composition, production, guitar, bass, synthesizer, piano, programming, clavinet
- Anthony Rossomando – lyrics, composition
- Victor Le Masne – strings
- Demian Arriaga – percussion
- Eli Gross – piano
- Cassidy Turbin – drums
- Matt Kirkwood – bass
- James Burkholder – strings
- Serban Ghenea – mixing
- Randy Merrill – mastering
- Bryce Bordone – mixing assistance
- Jelli Dorman – vocal engineering
- Fermin Suero Jr. – vocal engineering
- Alex Robinson – vocal engineering
- Kuk Harrell – vocal production
- Jon Yeston – engineering
- Quentin Andrianasitera – engineering assistance

== Charts ==
=== Weekly charts ===
Weekly chart performance
Chart (2025)	Peak position
Argentina Anglo Airplay (Monitor Latino)	4
Australia (ARIA)	48
Austria (Ö3 Austria Top 40)	25
Bolivia Anglo Airplay (Monitor Latino)	5
Brazil Hot 100 (Billboard)	77
Bulgaria Airplay (PROPHON) Purple Disco Machine Remix	10
Canada Hot 100 (Billboard)	53
Central America Anglo Airplay (Monitor Latino)	4
Chile Anglo Airplay (Monitor Latino)	5
China (TME Korean)	8
CIS Airplay (TopHit)	48
Croatia International Airplay (Top lista)	3
Dominican Republic Anglo Airplay (Monitor Latino)	10
Ecuador Anglo Airplay (Monitor Latino)	3
Estonia Airplay (TopHit)	40
Finland Airplay (Radiosoittolista)	70
France (SNEP)	62
Germany (GfK)	39
Global 200 (Billboard)	22
Greece International (IFPI)	20
Guatemala Anglo Airplay (Monitor Latino)	1
Ireland (IRMA)	35
Israel International Airplay (Media Forest)	16
Japan Heatseekers (Billboard Japan)	9
Kazakhstan Airplay (TopHit)	35
Latvia Airplay (LaIPA)	2
Lebanon (Lebanese Top 20)	13
Lithuania (AGATA)	33
Malaysia (IFPI)	13
Netherlands (Global Top 40)	8
Netherlands (Single Top 100)	69
Netherlands (Tipparade)	19
New Zealand (Recorded Music NZ)	36
Nicaragua Anglo Airplay (Monitor Latino)	3
Nigeria (TurnTable Top 100)	75
Panama Anglo Airplay (Monitor Latino)	12
Peru Anglo Airplay (Monitor Latino)	6
Philippines Hot 100 (Billboard Philippines)	25
Poland Airplay (OLiS)	43
Poland Streaming (OLiS)	62
Portugal (AFP)	46
Russia Airplay (TopHit)	101
Singapore (RIAS)	7
Slovakia Airplay (ČNS IFPI)	42
South Korea (Circle)	192
Sweden (Sverigetopplistan)	66
Switzerland (Schweizer Hitparade)	40
Taiwan (Billboard)	19
Thailand (IFPI)	1
UK Singles (Official Charts)	13
Uruguay Anglo Airplay (Monitor Latino)	12
US Billboard Hot 100	68
US Adult Pop Airplay (Billboard)	38
US Hot Dance/Pop Songs (Billboard)	2
US Pop Airplay (Billboard)	25
Venezuela Anglo Airplay (Monitor Latino)	4
Vietnam (IFPI)	13

=== Monthly charts ===
Monthly chart performance
Chart (2025)	Peak position
CIS Airplay (TopHit)	56
Estonia Airplay (TopHit)	50
Kazakhstan Airplay (TopHit)	48
Latvia Airplay (TopHit)	15
Lithuania Airplay (TopHit)	16

=== Year-end charts ===
Year-end chart performance
Chart (2025)	Position
Argentina Anglo Airplay (Monitor Latino)	29
Latvia Airplay (TopHit)	124
Lithuania Airplay (TopHit)	44
US Hot Dance/Pop Songs (Billboard)	20

== Certifications ==
Certifications
Region	Certification	Certified units/sales
Brazil (Pro-Música Brasil)	2× Platinum	80,000^{‡}
New Zealand (RMNZ)	Gold	15,000^{‡}
United Kingdom (BPI)	Silver	200,000^{‡}
United States (RIAA)	Gold	500,000^{‡}
^{‡} Sales+streaming figures based on certification alone.

== Release history ==
Release dates and formats
Region	Date	Format	Version	Label	Ref.
Various	February 6, 2025	Digital download; streaming	Original	Lloud; RCA	
Italy	February 7, 2025	Radio airplay	Original	Sony Music Italy	
United States	February 11, 2025	Contemporary hit radio	Original	Lloud; RCA	
Various	February 25, 2025	Digital download; streaming	Purple Disco Machine remix; Purple Disco Machine extended mix	Lloud; RCA	

== See also ==
- List of K-pop songs on the Billboard charts
- List of number-one songs (Thailand)
