= Moonlit Floor (Kiss Me) =

2024 single by Lisa

Single by Lisa

from the album Alter Ego
- Released: October 3, 2024
- Genre: Nu-disco
- Length: 2:35
- Label: Lloud; RCA
- Songwriters: Ryan Williamson; Jessie Reyez; Matt Slocum
- Producer: Rykeyz

Lisa singles chronology
"New Woman" (2024)	"Moonlit Floor (Kiss Me)" (2024)	"Born Again" (2025)

Performance video
- "Moonlit Floor (Kiss Me)" on YouTube

"Moonlit Floor (Kiss Me)", initially titled "Moonlit Floor", is a song by Thai rapper and singer Lisa. It was released through Lloud and RCA Records on October 3, 2024, as the third single from her debut studio album, Alter Ego (2025). Written by Jessie Reyez, Matt Slocum and its producer Rykeyz, it is a romantic nu-disco track whose chorus interpolates Sixpence None the Richer's "Kiss Me".

The song received mixed reviews from music critics, with some comparing it unfavorably to Sixpence None the Richer's "Kiss Me". It peaked at number 24 on the Billboard Global 200 and reached the top ten in Malaysia, Singapore, and Taiwan. In the United States, the song was certified gold by the Recording Industry Association of America (RIAA). In Thailand, it charted at number 12 on the Official Thailand Chart, which was introduced in 2025.

A performance video directed by Raja Virdi was released on Lloud's YouTube channel on October 9, 2024. Lisa first performed the song at the Global Citizen Festival prior to its release, and later at the Victoria's Secret Fashion Show and the Coachella Valley Music and Arts Festival. A "Santa Baby" remix version was released on November 29, 2024, and was performed at Amazing Thailand Countdown 2025.

== Background and release ==
After departing from her label YG Entertainment for individual activities, Lisa founded her own artist management company called Lloud in February 2024. She subsequently signed with RCA Records in April to release solo music in partnership with Lloud. She released "Rockstar" and "New Woman" featuring Rosalía as the first two singles from her upcoming solo album through Lloud and RCA Records in June and August, respectively. Lisa began teasing a follow-up release with TikTok videos posted starting September 15, featuring snippets of an unreleased track. On September 25, she posted a video of herself stepping up to a microphone and singing the words "so kiss me", blowing a smooch to the camera. Fans noticed the song's interpolation of American band Sixpence None the Richer's 1998 single "Kiss Me" and speculated that Sabrina Carpenter would feature on the track. During her headlining performance for the Global Citizen Festival on September 28, Lisa surprised audiences by performing the upcoming single for the first time. Following the live performance, she officially announced the track's release on her social media accounts for October 3, 2024, at 8 p.m. ET. As a holiday present, Lisa released a "Santa Baby" remix of the single on November 29, 2024, at midnight local time.

== Development and recording ==
"Moonlit Floor (Kiss Me)" was written by Jessie Reyez, Ryan Williamson (also known as Rykeyz), and Matt Slocum, the Sixpence None the Richer member who wrote "Kiss Me", while it was produced by Rykeyz. According to Williamson, the song was created at Chalice Studios in Los Angeles during a studio session with him and Reyez as their third song of the night. As he started to play on his Roland Juno-106, Reyez immediately starting writing a song to go along with his production. He recollected, "When she sang it down, I thought it was so fresh but thought it needed something to take the chorus overboard. I jokingly started singing 'Kiss Me' by Sixpence None the Richer." Reyez went along with the idea and made a "lyrical flip" on the original song, which Williamson felt "was exactly what the song needed to take it to that next level". The song was initially meant to be included on Reyez's second studio album, Yessie (2022), but her label was unable to clear the use of "Kiss Me" at the time. She added, "Ultimately the song didn’t fit the vibe of my project, so I put it in the pitch folder for songs I give away to other artists." She eventually got permission to interpolate "Kiss Me" after reaching out to Sixpence None the Richer's lead vocalist Leigh Nash on Instagram.

The song was then pitched to Lisa, who was a fan of the original version, having remembered her dad frequently playing the song in the car when she was five or six years old. Describing it as a full circle moment, she knew "As soon as I heard the song I was like, 'It’s that song!'" and decided to record it. Williamson expressed joy at her recording, stating: "We’re so grateful Lisa felt connected to the song and made it her own. She is the next big star in pop and we’re glad to be a part of her journey." Reyez hoped the song would push herself towards her personal goal of having two top-ten Billboard hits as a songwriter and performer. Nash also complimented her fresh take on the "Kiss Me" concept, saying, "Lisa did a great job with this version. As we head out on tour this fall, we’re excited to meet some of this new generation of 'Kiss Me' fans."

== Composition and lyrics ==
"Moonlit Floor (Kiss Me)" is a nu-disco track that offers a glimpse into Lisa's romantic life. The song's chorus interpolates Sixpence None the Richer's song "Kiss Me" with the original lyrics of "Kiss me beneath the milky twilight / Lead me out on the moonlit floor" tweaked to "Kiss me, under the Paris twilight / Kiss me out on the moonlit floor," matching the storyline about a French lover. Throughout the song, she sings about how he "got [her] trippin'" and offers various praises to his looks and abilities. In the second verse, she explains that she met him through work and inadvertently fell in love due to his appearance and accent.

On the "Santa Baby" remix, the subject of the lyrics is changed from a French lover to Santa Claus. The chorus is modified to "Kiss me, under the Christmas twilight / Kiss me, out on the moonlit floor", with Lisa now fantasizing about Santa. In the outro, she sings, "Santa Baby got me trippin’."

== Critical reception ==
Writing for Pitchfork, Joshua Minsoo Kim felt that "Moonlit Floor (Kiss Me)" was a highlight on the album that relies on a "tried-and-true formula" and works mainly because "the original hook is so indelible—all its tenderness is already understood, so hearing it collapse into dreamy eroticism feels apropos." Eunbo Shim of Billboard ranked it as the eighth-best song on the album that "swaps out innocence for a flirty, yet sweet allure" with a narrative that is "syrupy yet charming". Elise Ryan of the Associated Press noted that the song's re-interpretation of "Kiss Me" to depict a Paris romance was fitting for a Gen Z audience that "seeks fresh, catchy soundbites and feels nostalgic for a time before their own" but ended up "losing some of the charm of the original". Likewise, Benjamin Lassy of The Daily Campus praised the "tight production" involving "crispy drums" and a "punchy bass", but felt that the new "theming around France is a letdown." The Skinny's Rhys Morgan described the track as "sultry" yet a "blatant attempt to emulate the success of Sabrina Carpenter's 'Espresso'". Writing for Billboard Philippines, Gabriel Saulog negatively reviewed "Moonlit Floor (Kiss Me)" as a "lackluster impression" of Sixpence The Richer's "Kiss Me" rather than feeling like an original song and thought that it exemplified the simplistic, uninspired songwriting of some of the Alter Ego tracks. Other critics echoed the sentiment, with Ed Power of The Irish Times describing that it "cuts and pastes" the "appallingly twee" original and Shaad D'Souza of The Guardian calling it a "gratuitous 90s sample".

== Performance video ==
An official performance video directed by Raja Virdi was released on October 9 on Lloud's official YouTube channel. In it, Lisa performs the song with a live band in an empty venue. She wears two outfits during the course of the video: a white lace bodysuit with cow-print boots and a pale pink crop top and skirt featuring lace trim.

== Live performances ==
Lisa performed "Moonlit Floor (Kiss Me)" for the first time before the song's release on September 28 at the Global Citizen Festival. She later performed it on the runway of the Victoria's Secret Fashion Show 2024 on October 15. On New Year's Eve 2024, Lisa performed the "Santa Baby" remix of "Moonlit Floor (Kiss Me)" for the first time as a headliner for the Amazing Thailand Countdown 2025 event. She also performed the song at the Coachella Valley Music and Arts Festival on April 11 and 18, 2025. Lisa included "Moonlit Floor (Kiss Me)" on the setlist of her concert residency Viva La Lisa, which ran from November 12 to 29, 2026 in Las Vegas.

== Track listing ==
- Digital download and streaming
1. "Moonlit Floor (Kiss Me)" – 2:35
2. "Moonlit Floor (Kiss Me)" (live performance version) – 2:36
3. "Moonlit Floor (Kiss Me)" (instrumental) – 2:35
- Digital download and streaming – Santa Baby remix
1. "Moonlit Floor (Kiss Me)" (Santa Baby remix) – 2:35
2. "Moonlit Floor (Kiss Me)" – 2:35

== Credits and personnel ==
Credits adapted from the liner notes of Alter Ego.

Recording

- Mixed at MixStar Studios (Virginia Beach, Virginia)
- Post-production at The Ranch Studios
- Mastered at Sterling Sound (New York City)

Personnel

- Lisa – vocals
- Ryan Williamson – songwriter
- Jessie Reyez – songwriter
- Matt Slocum – songwriter
- Rykez – producer, drums, synths, guitars, bass, keyboards
- Kuk Harrell – vocal producer
- Jelli Dorman – vocal engineer
- Sarah Troy – background vocals
- Serban Ghenea – mix engineer
- Bryce Bordone – assistant mix engineer
- Randy Merrill – mastering engineer

== Charts ==
=== Weekly charts ===
Weekly chart performance
Chart (2024–2025)	Peak position
Argentina Anglo Airplay (Monitor Latino)	11
Belarus Airplay (TopHit)	5
Canada Hot 100 (Billboard)	88
Chile Anglo Airplay (Monitor Latino)	5
China (TME Korean)	7
CIS Airplay (TopHit)	10
Croatia International Airplay (Top lista)	58
Ecuador Anglo Airplay (Monitor Latino)	7
Estonia Airplay (TopHit)	77
Finland Airplay (Radiosoittolista)	77
Germany Airplay (BVMI)	48
Global 200 (Billboard)	24
Hong Kong (Billboard)	11
Indonesia (ASIRI)	31
Japan Heatseekers (Billboard Japan)	10
Kazakhstan Airplay (TopHit)	6
Latvia Airplay (LaIPA)	12
Lithuania Airplay (TopHit)	11
Malaysia International Streaming (RIM)	5
Mexico Anglo Airplay (Monitor Latino)	19
Moldova Airplay (TopHit)	79
Netherlands (Global Top 40)	12
New Zealand Hot Singles (RMNZ)	5
New Zealand Hot Singles (RMNZ) Santa Baby remix	22
Peru Anglo Airplay (Monitor Latino)	3
Philippines (Philippines Hot 100)	8
Puerto Rico Anglo Airplay (Monitor Latino)	6
Romania Airplay (Media Forest)	5
Russia Airplay (TopHit)	5
Singapore (RIAS)	6
South Korea (Circle)	161
Switzerland French Language Airplay (IFPI Schweiz)	21
Switzerland Italian Language Airplay (IFPI Schweiz)	4
Taiwan (Billboard)	8
Thailand (IFPI)	12
Ukraine Airplay (TopHit)	180
UK Singles Sales (OCC)	3
Uruguay Anglo Airplay (Monitor Latino)	9
US Bubbling Under Hot 100 (Billboard)	21
US Adult Contemporary (Billboard)	15
US Adult Pop Airplay (Billboard)	38
US Digital Song Sales (Billboard)	23
US Hot Dance/Pop Songs (Billboard)	14
US Pop Airplay (Billboard)	21

=== Monthly charts ===
Monthly chart performance
Chart (2024–2025)	Peak position
Belarus Airplay (TopHit)	6
CIS Airplay (TopHit)	11
Kazakhstan Airplay (TopHit)	7
Lithuania Airplay (TopHit)	11
Romania Airplay (TopHit)	19
Russia Airplay (TopHit)	6

=== Year-end charts ===
2024 year-end chart performance
Chart (2024)	Position
CIS Airplay (TopHit)	149
Romania Airplay (TopHit)	190
Russia Airplay (TopHit)	107

2025 year-end chart performance
Chart (2025)	Position
Belarus Airplay (TopHit)	30
CIS Airplay (TopHit)	128
Lithuania Airplay (TopHit)	153
Romania Airplay (TopHit)	74
Russia Airplay (TopHit)	133
US Adult Contemporary (Billboard)	42

== Certifications ==
Certifications
Region	Certification	Certified units/sales
Brazil (Pro-Música Brasil)	Platinum	40,000^{‡}
United States (RIAA)	Gold	500,000^{‡}
^{‡} Sales+streaming figures based on certification alone.

== Release history ==
Release dates and formats
Region	Date	Format	Version	Label	Ref.
Various	October 3, 2024	Digital download; streaming	Original	Lloud; RCA	
Various	October 8, 2024	Digital download; streaming	Live performance; instrumental	Lloud; RCA	
Italy	October 11, 2024	Radio airplay	Original	Sony Italy	
United States	October 15, 2024	Contemporary hit radio	Original	Lloud; RCA	
Various	November 29, 2024	Digital download; streaming	Santa Baby remix	Lloud; RCA	

== See also ==
- List of K-pop songs on the Billboard charts
- List of UK Singles Downloads Chart number ones of the 2020s
