= Alter Ego (Lisa album) =

- Digital and standard cover

Studio album by Lisa
- Released: February 28, 2025
- Recorded: 2024
- Studios: Paradise Sound Recording (Los Angeles); Conway Recording (Los Angeles); Legend Music (Phuket)
- Length: 32:58
- Languages: English; Spanish
- Labels: Lloud; RCA
- Producers: Ryan Tedder; Sam Homaee; Ilya; Abby Keen; Sammy Soso; ATL Jacob; Believve; Grant Boutin; James Essein; FnZ; Hendrix Smoke; her0ism; Cooper Holzman; Ivsir; Rob Knox; Max Martin; Mocha; MW; Ninetyniiine; Ojivolta; Ari PenSmith; Raye; Rykeyz; Stargate; Tropikillaz; Andrew Wells; Shintaro Yasuda

Lisa chronology
Lalisa (2021)	Alter Ego (2025)	Press Play (2026)

Singles from Alter Ego
- 1. "Rockstar" Released: June 27, 2024; 2. "New Woman" Released: August 15, 2024; 3. "Moonlit Floor (Kiss Me)" Released: October 3, 2024; 4. "Born Again" Released: February 6, 2025; 5. "Fxck Up the World" Released: February 28, 2025

Alter Ego is the debut solo studio album by Thai rapper and singer Lisa. Released on February 28, 2025, by Lloud and RCA Records, the album marks Lisa's first solo release after departing from YG Entertainment and Interscope Records in 2023. She developed Alter Ego with a range of collaborators, including Ryan Tedder, Ilya Salmanzadeh, and Max Martin. It was conceived as a 15-track album exploring hip-hop, electropop and trap styles and features guest appearances from Rosalía and Tyla; Future, Megan Thee Stallion, Doja Cat and Raye also appear on digital editions. The album's subject matter explores Lisa's personality, fame, and success through the lens of various alter egos.

Alter Ego generally received mixed reviews, with critics praising its strong pop production and versatility but criticizing its lack of cohesion and identity. Upon release, the album debuted at number seven on the US Billboard 200. In South Korea, Alter Ego charted at number six on the Circle Retail Album Chart. It also debuted in the top ten in Australia, Belgium, France, Germany, the Netherlands, and Switzerland, while also charting in the top twenty in Italy, Japan, New Zealand, and the United Kingdom.

The album was supported by five singles: "Rockstar", "New Woman", "Moonlit Floor (Kiss Me)", "Born Again", and "Fxck Up the World". The lead single "Rockstar" reached the top five of the Billboard Global 200 and topped charts in Hong Kong and Malaysia, while "Born Again" and the track "Dream" both peaked at number one in Thailand. All singles peaked within the top 25 of the Global 200 and three entered the US Billboard Hot 100. In promotion of the record, she embarked on the Lisa Fan Meetup in Asia 2024 tour and performed at the Coachella Valley Music and Arts Festival.

== Background ==
In December 2023, Lisa announced her departure from YG Entertainment for her solo work, while remaining with YG to continue her activities as a member of Blackpink. She established her own management company named Lloud in February 2024 and signed with RCA Records in April to release solo music in partnership with Lloud. In May 2024, Legend Music Studio in Phuket, Thailand posted a photo with Lisa on Facebook and shared that RCA Records flew in a team including "one of the best vocal producers in the world" to record several tracks with the singer at the studio. Lisa first teased the title of her upcoming album in the music video for the single "New Woman" in August, in which multiple women were shown reading a magazine named Alter Ego. In an interview for her Billboard cover story in November, she shared that she was working hard on the album "trying to figure it out, the track list and everything, what I can change in there" and played some of the unfinished songs for the reporter.

== Concept and title ==
Lisa explores five different inner personas on Alter Ego, each of which has their own names and character traits. The five "alter egos", named Roxi, Kiki, Vixi, Sunni, and Speedi, correspond to various tracks on the album and feature on physical versions with their own cover art. According to Lisa, the concept came about as she was "trying so many different kinds of music styles while I was recording." Wanting to incorporate various genres into one album, she thought, "Oh, well I've never done this kind of stuff before, but it sounds great. Why not just kind of like put all the different styles into the album and call it Alter Ego?" The album's promotional campaign uses a five-point star as a recurring emblem to represent the five alter egos, while its trailer video features the rapper in five locations, one for each persona: a black rock structure, an outer-space catwalk, an enchanted garden, a green laser-beam motorcycle track, and a volcanic red runway.

The first alter ego, Roxi, is inspired by the song "Rockstar" and is depicted on cover art holding a guitar in an enchanted garden, with an accompanying description describing her as a rockstar that lives to "entertain and always command the stage". The second alter ego, Sunni, deriving from "Moonlit Floor (Kiss Me)", is a free-spirited French speaker with brown curly hair who has a "je ne sais quoi for sun-kissed days and sea-breezy nights". The third alter ego, Kiki, based on "New Woman", is an Internet lover with a sassy Y2K aesthetic who can be found "burning CDs or finding something new to obsess over" and is styled with pink hair and a pink wardrobe. The fourth alter ego, Speedi, corresponding to "Lifestyle", is a sports car driver with bright orange hair who is "built for the rush, wired for the win" and has "just installed the NOS kit" in her car. The fifth alter ego, Vixi, accompanies the song "Fxck Up the World" and is "the one they love to call the 'Villain'". The album's official tie-in comic, Alter-Ego: The Official Comic, features the five alter egos as friends in a cyberpunk city, working together to save Vixi from being trapped in virtual reality.

== Promotion and release ==
After the release of the yet-unannounced album's first three singles, Lisa launched the Lisa Fan Meetup in Asia 2024 tour, which spanned five cities including Singapore, Bangkok, Jakarta, Kaohsiung, and Hong Kong, in November 2024. On November 11, during the first night of the fan meet tour, a snippet of a cinematic teaser video, which featured Lisa playing guitar against a desolate cyberpunk landscape and summoning a ray of purple light from the sky, was released. The teaser's caption revealed one letter of the project's title. A week-long countdown that was due to end on November 19 also appeared on Lisa's website. Further segments of the teaser were later released during the tour, each revealing another letter of the project's name. After the final Hong Kong show on November 19, Lisa premiered the full three-minute trailer and officially announced that her first studio album Alter Ego would be released on February 28, 2025. She also revealed the album's cover art, which featured a close-up photo of Lisa in a black hood bringing her manicured hand to her face. On January 6, 2025, Lisa posted a short video clip of a text exchange featuring an "alter ego" with the caption: "Roxi has entered the chat." The video ended by pinpointing a distinct location corresponding to the character, while she unveiled the description and album cover art for the character on her website; she repeated the same process to reveal the remaining alter egos Sunni, Kiki, Speedi, and Vixi.

On February 18, Lisa announced the launch of her comic company Lalisa Comics in partnership with Zero Zero Entertainment. The company's first release on March 24 was a limited edition 56-page graphic novel titled Alter-Ego: The Official Comic, a companion piece to the album authored by Lisa and illustrated by Minomiyabi. On February 21, Lisa posted a video revealing the album tracklist, in which she takes a seat with her different alter egos over a snippet of the song "Fxck Up the World". Alter Ego was released on February 28 as a standard 12-track album on streaming, digital platforms, CD and vinyl as well as a 15-track album with three bonus tracks on streaming and digital platforms only. It was available across nine CD variants, all containing collectibles with some being randomised, six deluxe boxed sets containing a CD and a branded piece of clothing, and two vinyl variants. A limited digital 19-track edition titled Thank You Lilies was released exclusively on Lisa's official webstore containing the Victoria's Secret versions of "Rockstar" and "Moonlit Floor (Kiss Me)", the Purple Disco Machine remix of "Born Again", and a voice note from Lisa titled "Thank You Lilies".

The album's release date coincided with the running airdates of the third season of the HBO TV series The White Lotus, where Lisa made her acting debut. As a result, Lisa has extensively promoted her album together with her role on the series, providing interviews with online and radio talk shows, such as Hot Ones, Woody FM, Vogue's What's in My Bag?, and BBC Radio 1. She has also been featured on interviews with publications including Vanity Fair, The Wall Street Journal, Elle, and Billboard, the last of which featured her on ten different covers around the world as the publication's first-ever global cover star. On May 29, a documentary film about Lisa was announced to be in production from Sony Music Vision. Directed by Sue Kim, the film chronicles the artist's life and solo career for the previous year.

=== Singles ===
Five singles supported Alter Ego. The lead single, "Rockstar", was released on June 27, 2024. The song debuted at number four on the Billboard Global 200 and number one on the Global Excl. US, earning Lisa her third top-ten hit on the former and her first chart-topper on the latter. It also became her highest-charting entry on the US Billboard Hot 100 at number 70. The album's second single, "New Woman" featuring Rosalía, was released on August 15. It debuted at number 15 on the Billboard Global 200, number six on the Global Excl. US, becoming Lisa's fourth top-ten hit, and number 97 on the US Billboard Hot 100. The third single, "Moonlit Floor (Kiss Me)", was released on October 3. The song peaked at number 24 on the Billboard Global 200 and number 14 on the Global Excl. US. The fourth single, "Born Again" featuring Doja Cat and Raye, was released on February 6, 2025. It became Lisa's first number one on the Official Thailand Chart and her highest-charting song on the Billboard Hot 100 at number 68, also peaking at number 22 on the Billboard Global 200 and number 12 on the Global Excl. US. "Fxck Up the World" featuring Future was released as the fifth single alongside the album's release on February 28. It peaked at number two on the Official Thailand Chart, number 25 on the Billboard Global 200, and number 14 on the Global Excl. US. A music video for the song "When I'm with You" featuring Tyla was released on May 16. Following the music video release, it peaked at number six on the Official Thailand Chart. A short film for the song "Dream" starring Lisa and Japanese actor Kentaro Sakaguchi premiered on August 13. The track became her second number one on the Official Thailand Chart and peaked at number 122 on the Global Excl. US.

=== Live performances ===
On September 11, 2024, Lisa debuted "New Woman" and "Rockstar" at the 2024 MTV Video Music Awards in Elmont, New York. She presented both songs and "Moonlit Floor (Kiss Me)" before its release as a headliner for the Global Citizen Festival in New York City on September 28. On October 15, she performed "Rockstar" and "Moonlit Floor (Kiss Me)" at the Victoria's Secret Fashion Show 2024. She also showcased the three singles on the Lisa Fan Meetup in Asia 2024 tour, which comprised five shows between November 11 and 19. On New Year's Eve, Lisa performed "Rockstar", "New Woman", and the "Santa Baby" remix of "Moonlit Floor (Kiss Me)" as a headliner for Amazing Thailand Countdown 2025 in Bangkok. She performed songs from Alter Ego at the Coachella Valley Music and Arts Festival on April 11 and 18, 2025.

== Critical reception ==
Professional ratings
Aggregate scores
Source	Rating
Metacritic	58/100
Review scores
Source	Rating
The Guardian	2/5 stars
The Irish Times	2/5 stars
IZM	2.5/5 stars
The New York Times	3/5 stars
NME	3/5 stars
Pitchfork	5.2/10
Rolling Stone	3.5/5 stars
The Skinny	2/5 stars
The Times	3/5 stars

Alter Ego generally received mixed reviews from critics. According to the review aggregator Metacritic, Alter Ego received "mixed or average reviews" based on a weighted average score of 58 out of 100 from six critic scores. Writing for Rolling Stone, Maura Johnston scored Alter Ego 3.5 out of 5 stars and praised it for its showcase of Lisa's "sturdy yet winsome singing" and versatility as an artist, as highlighted by the record's multi-persona concept, but commented on it "feeling a bit pieced-together". Associated Press's Elise Ryan similarly lauded the album for its "chameleonic adoption of styles" and "interesting pop productions" but criticized it for being too "feature-heavy", which detracts from clearly introducing Lisa to its listeners. Shaad D'Souza of The Guardian also found fault with Alter Ego being packed with multiple styles and guests artists, opining that the collaborators stand out more in the album than Lisa herself. In contrast, NME's Crystal Bell noted that Lisa's best works on Alter Ego stemmed from her collaborations; however, she criticized the album as a whole to be a project that embraced variety, spectacle, and sonic experimentation rather than cohesion, artistic vision, or deeper insight into Lisa's identity.

In a mixed three-star review for The Times, Will Hodgkinson contextualized the album as a result of K-pop's rigorous training system, summarizing Alter Ego's "ruthless efficiency" to be "a distillation of every popular style of modern times, repackaged and scrubbed up for an audience who like their idols flawless and impenetrable". Pitchfork's Joshua Minsoo Kim negatively labeled the album as "the most generic embodiment of a pop star", criticizing its lack of depth. Another negative review by Ed Power for The Irish Times reiterated criticisms of the album's lack of personality and identity.

== Accolades ==
Awards and nominations for Alter Ego
Year	Organization	Award	Result	Ref.
2025	Asian Pop Music Awards	Top 20 Albums of the Year	Won	
2025	Asian Pop Music Awards	People's Choice Award	Nominated	
2026	Clio Awards	Music Marketing – Album Launch/Artist Promotion Integrated Campaign	Bronze	
2026	iHeartRadio Music Awards	Favorite Debut Album	Nominated	

== Commercial performance ==
In South Korea, Alter Ego charted at number six on the Circle Retail Album Chart, while charting at number seventeen on the monthly chart. In the United States, Alter Ego debuted at number seven on the Billboard 200, earning 45,500 album-equivalent units in its first week of release. The sum included 28,000 album sales, 16,500 streaming equivalent albums (from 23.12 million on-demand official streams), and 1,000 track equivalent albums. With this, Lisa earned the top debut of the week and became the second Blackpink member to achieve a solo top-ten album after Rosé's Rosie (2024). In Australia, the album debuted at number five on the ARIA Albums Chart, becoming the second solo album by a Blackpink member to enter the top ten after Rosie.

== Track listing ==
Credits adapted from album liner notes and Tidal for the digital bonus tracks.

Alter Ego standard edition track listing
No.	Title	Writer(s)	Producer(s)	Length
1.	"Rockstar"	Lisa; Ryan Tedder; Sam Homaee; Delacey; Lucy Healey; James Essien	Tedder; Homaee	2:18
2.	"Elastigirl"	Lisa; Cooper Holzman; Elle Campbell; Rollo; Connor Blake	Holzman	2:57
3.	"Thunder"	Lisa; Ilya Salmanzadeh; Robin Tadross; Abby Keen	Ilya; Rob Knox; A. Keen^{[c]}	2:48
4.	"New Woman" (featuring Rosalía)	Lisa; Rosalía Vila Tobella; Tove Lo; Tove Burman; Max Martin; Salmanzadeh	Ilya; Martin	2:59
5.	"Fxck Up the World" (Vixi solo version)	Lisa; Jaeyoung Lee; Michael Mule; Isaac De Boni; Jacob Canady; Derrick Miller; Nija Charles	FnZ; ATL Jacob; Hendrix Smoke	2:55
6.	"Rapunzel" (Kiki solo version)	Lisa; Tedder; Homaee; Gregory Aldae Hein; Carly Gibert	Tedder; Homaee	2:19
7.	"Moonlit Floor (Kiss Me)"	Jessie Reyez; Ryan Williamson; Matt Slocum	Rykeyz	2:35
8.	"When I'm with You" (featuring Tyla)	Lisa; Tyla Seethal; Samuel Awuku; Richard Isong; Ariowa Irosogie; Imani Lewis; Corey Lindsay-Keay	Ari PenSmith; Mocha; Sammy Soso; Believve; P2J^{[a]}	2:52
9.	"Badgrrrl"	Lisa; Mark Williams; Raul Cubina; Nathan Chen; Philip Mueller; Risvi Tareq; Mouad Oudra; Kobe Hood	Ojivolta; Ninetyniine; Ivsir; MW; DJH^{[a]}	2:12
10.	"Lifestyle"	Lisa; Tedder; Grant Boutin; A. Keen; Essien	Tedder; Boutin; A. Keen; Essien	2:41
11.	"Chill"	Lisa; Mikkel S. Eriksen; Tor Hermansen; Zegon; Laudz; Awuku; Ali Tamposi; Amanda Ibanez; Billy Walsh; John Byron	Stargate; Tropikillaz; Sammy Soso	2:39
12.	"Dream"	Lisa; Shintaro Yasuda; her0ism; Felicia Ferraro; Tamposi	Yasuda; her0ism	3:43
Total length:				32:58

Alter Ego digital bonus edition track listing
No.	Title	Writer(s)	Producer(s)	Length
1.	"Born Again" (featuring Doja Cat and Raye)	Rachel Keen; Amala Zandile Dlamini; Andrew Wells; Anthony Rossomando	Raye; Wells	3:51
6.	"Fxck Up the World" (featuring Future)	Lisa; Nayvadius Wilburn; Lee; Mule; De Boni; Canady; Miller; Charles	FnZ; ATL Jacob; Hendrix Smoke	3:04
7.	"Rapunzel" (featuring Megan Thee Stallion)	Lisa; Megan Pete; Tedder; Homaee; Hein; Gibert	Tedder; Homaee	2:45
Total length:				42:38

=== Notes ===
- ^{^[a]} signifies an additional producer.
- ^{^[c]} signifies a co-producer.
- "Rockstar" contains a sample of "New Person, Same Old Mistakes", written by Kevin Parker, as performed by Tame Impala.
- "Moonlit Floor (Kiss Me)" contains an interpolation of "Kiss Me", written by Matt Slocum and performed by Sixpence None the Richer.
- A digital limited version of Alter Ego entitled Thank You Lilies includes the Victoria's Secret versions of "Rockstar" and "Moonlit Floor (Kiss Me)", the Purple Disco Machine remix of "Born Again", and a voice note labeled "Thank You Lilies".
- The digital bonus editions of Alter Ego place the solo versions of "Fxck Up the World" and "Rapunzel" at positions 14 and 15, respectively.

== Personnel ==
Credits adapted from Tidal.

=== Musicians ===
- Lisa – vocals (all tracks)
- Doja Cat – vocals (track 1)
- Raye – vocals (track 1)
- Andrew Wells – bass, clavinet, guitar, piano, programming, synthesizer (track 1)
- Demian Arriga – bongo bell, percussion (track 1)
- Cassidy Turbin – drums (track 1)
- Eli Goss – piano (track 1)
- James Burkholder – strings (track 1)
- Victor Le Masne – strings (track 1)
- Elle Campbell – background vocals (track 3)
- Ilya – bass, drums, percussion, programming, background vocals (tracks 4, 5); synthesizer (track 4); keyboards (track 5)
- Rob Knox – bass, drums, percussion, programming, synthesizer (track 4)
- Abby Keen – background vocals (track 4)
- Max Martin – bass, drums, keyboards, programming (track 5)
- Rosalía – vocals (track 5)
- Doris Sandberg – background vocals (track 5)
- Tove Lo – background vocals (track 5)
- Tove Burman – background vocals (track 5)
- Future – vocals (track 6)
- Alice Kang – background vocals (track 6)
- Chase Johnson – background vocals (track 6)
- Chloe Donovan – background vocals (track 6)
- JJ Joe – background vocals (track 6)
- Jaeyoung Lee – background vocals (track 6)
- Kuk Harrell – background vocals (track 6)
- Tonianne Tartaro – background vocals (track 6)
- Megan Thee Stallion – vocals (track 7)
- Carly Gibert – background vocals (track 7)
- Rykez – bass, guitar, keyboards, synthesizer (track 8)
- Sarah Troy – background vocals (track 8)
- Tyla – vocals (track 9)
- Ojivolta – programming, bass, drums, keyboards (track 10)
- Shintaro Yasuda – programming, drums, keyboards (track 13)
- her0ism – programming, guitar, keyboards (track 13)

=== Technical ===
- Serban Ghenea – mixing (tracks 1–5, 8, 10, 12)
- Bryce Bordone – mixing assistance (tracks 1–2, 4–5, 8, 10, 12)
- Rob Kinselski – mixing (track 3)
- Eli Heisler – mixing assistance (track 3)
- Ruby Smith – mixing assistance (track 3)
- Patrizio Pigliapoco – mixing (track 6)
- Fredrico Giordano – mixing assistance (track 6)
- Ignacio Portales – mixing assistance (track 6)
- Manny Marroquin – mixing (tracks 5, 7, 11)
- Leondro Hidalgo – mixing (track 9)
- Aidan Duncan – mixing assistance (track 9)
- Serge Courtois – mixing (track 13)
- Randy Merrill – mastering
- Andrew Wells – engineering (track 1)
- Jon Yeston – engineering (track 1)
- Sam Holland – engineering (track 5)
- Alex Robinson – vocal engineering (track 1)
- Fermin Suero Jr. – vocal engineering (tracks 1, 4)
- Jelli Dorman – vocal engineering (tracks 1–3, 5–13)
- Johnny Breakwell – vocal engineering (track 1)
- David Rodriguez – vocal engineering (track 5)
- Miguel Correa – vocal engineering (track 6)
- Austin Jux-Chandler – vocal engineering (track 9)
- Kuk Harrell – vocal production
- Quentin Andrianasitera – engineering assistance (track 1)
- Anthony Vilchis – engineering assistance (track 5), mixing assistance (tracks 7, 11)
- Trey Station – engineering assistance (track 5), mixing assistance (tracks 7, 11)
- Zach Pereyra – engineering assistance (track 5), mixing assistance (tracks 7, 11)
- Chad Kitchens – additional engineering (track 6)

== Charts ==
=== Weekly charts ===
Weekly chart performance for Alter Ego
Chart (2025)	Peak position
Australian Albums (ARIA)	5
Austrian Albums (Ö3 Austria)	2
Belgian Albums (Ultratop Flanders)	4
Belgian Albums (Ultratop Wallonia)	3
Canadian Albums (Billboard)	21
Croatian International Albums (HDU)	11
Dutch Albums (Album Top 100)	7
Finnish Albums (Suomen virallinen lista)	32
French Albums (SNEP)	3
German Albums (Offizielle Top 100)	2
Hungarian Albums (MAHASZ)	21
Irish Albums (Official Charts)	41
Italian Albums (FIMI)	17
Japanese Albums (Oricon)	18
Japanese Combined Albums (Oricon)	26
Japanese Hot Albums (Billboard Japan)	83
Lithuanian Albums (AGATA)	19
New Zealand Albums (RMNZ)	11
Norwegian Albums (VG-lista)	29
Polish Albums (ZPAV)	4
Portuguese Albums (AFP)	10
Scottish Albums (Official Charts)	9
South Korean Retail Albums (Circle)	6
Spanish Albums (Promusicae)	3
Swedish Albums (Sverigetopplistan)	33
Swiss Albums (Schweizer Hitparade)	5
UK Albums (Official Charts)	20
US Billboard 200	7

=== Monthly charts ===
Monthly chart performance for Alter Ego
Chart (2025)	Peak position
Japanese Albums (Oricon)	44
South Korean Retail Albums (Circle)	17

=== Year-end charts ===
Year-end chart performance for Alter Ego
Chart (2025)	Position
Belgian Albums (Ultratop Wallonia)	179
French Albums (SNEP)	131
Polish Albums (ZPAV)	94

== Certifications ==
Certifications for "Alter Ego"
Region	Certification	Certified units/sales
Brazil (Pro-Música Brasil)	Platinum	40,000^{‡}
Poland (ZPAV)	Gold	15,000^{‡}
^{‡} Sales+streaming figures based on certification alone.

== Release history ==
Release dates and formats for Alter Ego
Region	Date	Format	Label	Ref.
Various	February 28, 2025	CD; vinyl LP; digital download; streaming	Lloud; RCA	

== See also ==
- List of K-pop albums on the Billboard charts
