= When I'm with You (Lisa song) =

Song by Lisa featuring Tyla

from the album Alter Ego
- Released: February 28, 2025
- Genre: R&B
- Length: 2:52
- Label: Lloud; RCA
- Songwriters: Lisa; Tyla Seethal; Samuel Awuku; Richard Isong; Ariowa Irosogie; Imani Lewis; Corey Marlon Lindsay-Keay
- Producers: Ari PenSmith; Mocha; Sammy Soso; Believve; P2J

Music video
- "When I'm with You" on YouTube

"When I'm with You" is a song by Thai rapper and singer Lisa featuring South African singer Tyla. It was released through Lloud and RCA Records on February 28, 2025, as a track on Lisa's debut studio album, Alter Ego (2025). An accompanying music video was directed by Olivia De Camps and uploaded on Lloud's YouTube channel on May 16.

== Background and release ==
After departing from her label YG Entertainment for solo activities, Lisa founded her own artist management company called Lloud in February 2024. She subsequently signed with RCA Records in April to release solo music in partnership with Lloud. She was introduced to Tyla one night in the studio in Los Angeles with producer and songwriter Sammy Soso, who had worked with both artists. Tyla, who was preparing to release her self-titled debut studio album (2024), came to the studio and let Lisa listen to the album in full. Months later in July, the artists appeared together in Rolling Stone's "Musicians on Musicians" series and interviewed one another. On November 19, Lisa announced her debut studio album, Alter Ego (2025). She posted the album's tracklist on February 21, 2025, which included "When I'm with You" featuring Tyla as the album's ninth track. It marked Lisa and Tyla's first time collaborating on a song together. The song was released alongside the album on February 28, 2025.

== Composition and lyrics ==
"When I'm With You" was written by the artists Lisa and Tyla with Samuel Awuku, Imani Lewis, Corey Marlon Lindsay-Keay, P2J, and Ari PenSmith. The latter two produced the song with Mocha, Sammy Soso, and Believve. It is a lo-fi song that blends "smooth R&B harmonies with minimalist, electric piano-driven production." Lyrically, it captures the "excitement of a casual fling blossoming into much more." In the first verse, Lisa and Tyla sing about ignoring their friends' warnings and being unable to resist a new love interest: "My girls told me take it slow / But they don’t know what I know / Say I need to stay composed / But they don’t know what I know / Told me I should leave you alone / Told me, ‘Stay your ass at home’ / But I don’t mind." The rest of the song centers on Lisa and Tyla pursuing the romance with no reservations, with Tyla singing "All my pride goes out the window / When I’m with you." In her rap verse, Lisa expresses her feelings for her lover: "I like that side of me when we get together / I’m way better / When I’m with you."

== Critical reception ==
"When I'm with You" received positive reviews from critics as one of the highlights on Alter Ego, with praise going towards the artists' vocals and chemistry. It was called a "smooth, effortless duet" by NME's Crystal Bell and "sweetly effervescent" by Rolling Stone's Maura Johnston, who pointed to the track as an "example of how Lisa shines brightest in the moments when her sturdy, yet winsome singing takes center stage." Writing for Billboard, Eunbo Shim ranked it as the fourth-best song on the album and echoed the praise for Lisa's "polished singing", describing it as a "deliberate showcase of her versatility beyond rap." He further commended Lisa's "tight rap verses" and found the song to be proof of her "ability to anchor both flow and melody in her songs." Tyla's vocals were also praised as "soulful" by Elise Ryan of Associated Press as well as "lithe" and "soft" in comparison to the "metallic sheen" of Lisa's voice by Shaad D'Souza of The Guardian. Billboard Philippines's Gabriel Saulog opined that Tyla's "gorgeous" feature added "a whole lot heart and sensuality to Lisa's sonic capabilities", particularly when the duo's voices harmonize on the final chorus. Writing for The Daily Campus, Benjamin Lassy found the song to be a "highlight" on the album with "solid moments, especially a warm chorus accompaniment as a fade out." Pitchfork's Joshua Minsoo Kim described the song and its "syncopated percussion" as "seductive" and a "welcome change of pace", though he felt it was worse than the songs on Tyla. Jon Caramanica of The New York Times wrote that Lisa sounded "tentative" besides Tyla on the track.

== Accolades ==
Awards and nominations for "When I'm with You"
Year	Organization	Award	Result	Ref.
2025	Berlin Commercial Festival	Best Music Video	Nominated	
2025	Berlin Commercial Festival	Craft: Cinematography	Nominated	
2025	Berlin Commercial Festival	Craft: Editing	Nominated	

== Music video ==
A scene in the music video of Lisa and Tyla performing sensual choreography together.

An accompanying music video for "When I'm with You" was directed by Olivia De Camps and uploaded to Lloud's YouTube channel on May 16, 2025. Lisa teased its release earlier in the day with a teaser clip captioned “Had the best time making this music video with Tyla 😘". Set on a hot summer day, the video begins with a weather forecaster announcing on the radio that a heatwave will make it "the hottest summer ever recorded." In accordance with the summer setting, Lisa and Tyla show off a "sultry wardrobe full of cut-out dresses, crop tops, and lace-up heels." The video intersperses "hot and heavy" choreography dance breaks with "cool waves of poolside shots." For the first verse, the artists trade lines as Lisa fans herself on a lounge chair and Tyla hangs out with friends at a salon, before they unite to dance through the song’s chorus. After the sun goes down, the duo attend a late-night pool party with "plenty of dancing, a throne made of ice, and an unexpected rainstorm." In the second verse, American actor Mason Gooding flirts shirtless with Lisa by the pool as she raps and dances on him. Love Island stars Leah Kateb and Miguel Harichi also make cameo appearances, depicted on a poolside date night. The video culminates with Lisa and Tyla taking a swim in the pool together during the song's outro.

== Live performances ==
Lisa performed "When I'm with You" live for the first time at the Coachella Valley Music and Arts Festival on April 11 and 18, 2025. She included the song on the setlist of her concert residency Viva La Lisa, which ran from November 12 to 29, 2026 in Las Vegas.

== Credits and personnel ==
Credits adapted from the liner notes of Alter Ego.

Recording

- Mixed at SoundRight Music Studios (Los Angeles, California)

Personnel

- Lisa – vocals, songwriter
- Tyla – featured vocals, songwriter
- Samuel Awuku – songwriter
- P2J – songwriter, additional producer
- Ari PenSmith – songwriter, producer
- Imani Lewis – songwriter
- Corey Marlon Lindsay-Keay – songwriter
- Sammy Soso – producer
- Mocha – producer
- Believve – producer
- Kuk Harrell – vocal producer
- Jelli Dorman – vocal engineer
- Austen Jux-Chandler – vocal engineer
- Leandro "Dro" Hidalgo – mix engineer
- Aidan Duncan – assistant mix engineer

== Charts ==
Chart performance for "When I'm with You"
Chart (2025)	Peak position
China (TME Korean)	36
New Zealand Hot Singles (RMNZ)	22
Thailand (IFPI)	6
