= MTV Europe Music Award for Best Collaboration =

Category of MTV Europe Music Awards

- Awarded for: Collaborative songs
- Country: Europe
- Presented by: MTV
- First award: 2015
- Currently held by: Lisa (feat. Rosalía) – "New Woman" (2024)

Highlights
- Most awards: Karol G and Rosalía (2)
- Most nominations: Justin Bieber, David Guetta, Bebe Rexha, Bruno Mars, and Shakira (3)
- Website: ema.mtv.tv

The MTV Europe Music Award for Best Collaboration is an award category at the MTV Europe Music Awards. The award was first presented in 2015 and not given from 2016 to 2018, making a return in 2019. Karol G and Rosalía are the only artists to win this award twice, Karol G for "Tusa" with Nicki Minaj in 2020 and "TQG" with Shakira in 2023, and Rosalía for "Con Altura" with J Balvin and El Guincho in 2019 and "New Woman" with Lisa in 2024.

== Winners and nominees ==
Winners are listed first and highlighted in bold.

† indicates an MTV Video Music Award for Best Collaboration–winning artist.
‡ indicates an MTV Video Music Award for Best Collaboration–nominated artist that same year

=== 2010s ===
Year	Artists	Song	Ref
2015
2015	**Skrillex, Diplo and Justin Bieber**	**"Where Are Ü Now"**	
2015	David Guetta (feat. Nicki Minaj, Bebe Rexha and Afrojack)	"Hey Mama"	
2015	Mark Ronson (feat. Bruno Mars)	"Uptown Funk" ‡	
2015	Taylor Swift (feat. Kendrick Lamar)	"Bad Blood" †	
2015	Wiz Khalifa (feat. Charlie Puth)	"See You Again" ‡	
2019
2019	**Rosalía and J Balvin (feat. El Guincho)**	**"Con Altura"**	
2019	BTS and Halsey	"Boy with Luv" ‡	
2019	Lil Nas X (feat. Billy Ray Cyrus)	"Old Town Road (Remix)" ‡	
2019	Mark Ronson (feat. Miley Cyrus)	"Nothing Breaks Like a Heart"	
2019	Shawn Mendes and Camila Cabello	"Señorita" †	
2019	The Chainsmokers and Bebe Rexha	"Call You Mine"	

=== 2020s ===
Year	Artists	Song	Ref
2020
2020	**Karol G (feat. Nicki Minaj)**	**"Tusa"** ‡	
2020	Blackpink and Selena Gomez	"Ice Cream"	
2020	Cardi B (feat. Megan Thee Stallion)	"WAP" ‡	
2020	DaBaby (feat. Roddy Ricch)	"Rockstar"	
2020	Justin Bieber (feat. Quavo)	"Intentions"	
2020	Lady Gaga and Ariana Grande	"Rain on Me" †	
2020	Sam Smith and Demi Lovato	"I'm Ready"	
2021
2021	**Doja Cat (feat. SZA)**	**"Kiss Me More"** †	
2021	Black Eyed Peas and Shakira	"Girl Like Me"	
2021	Lil Nas X and Jack Harlow	"Industry Baby" †	
2021	The Kid Laroi and Justin Bieber	"Stay" ‡	
2021	Silk Sonic (Bruno Mars and Anderson .Paak)	"Leave the Door Open"	
2021	The Weeknd and Ariana Grande	"Save Your Tears" (Remix)	
2022
2022	**David Guetta and Bebe Rexha**	**"I'm Good (Blue)"**	
2022	Bad Bunny and Chenco Corleone	"Me Porto Bonito"	
2022	Megan Thee Stallion and Dua Lipa	"Sweetest Pie" ‡	
2022	Post Malone and Doja Cat	"I Like You (A Happier Song)"	
2022	Tiësto and Ava Max	"The Motto"	
2022	Shakira and Rauw Alejandro	"Te Felicito"	
2022	DJ Khaled (feat. Drake and Lil Baby)	"Staying Alive"	
2023
2023	**Karol G and Shakira**	**"TQG" †**	
2023	Central Cee and Dave	"Sprinter"	
2023	David Guetta, Anne-Marie and Coi Leray	"Baby Don't Hurt Me"	
2023	Metro Boomin, The Weeknd and 21 Savage	"Creepin'"	
2023	PinkPantheress and Ice Spice	"Boy's a Liar Pt. 2"	
2023	Rema and Selena Gomez	"Calm Down" ‡	
2024
2024	**Lisa (feat. Rosalía)**	**"New Woman"**	
2024	Charli XCX (feat. Billie Eilish)	"Guess"	
2024	Future, Metro Boomin and Kendrick Lamar	"Like That"	
2024	Lady Gaga and Bruno Mars	"Die with a Smile"	
2024	Peso Pluma and Anitta	"Bellakeo"	
2024	Taylor Swift (feat. Post Malone)	"Fortnight" †	

== Statistics ==
=== Artists with multiple wins ===
2 wins

- Karol G
- Rosalía

=== Artists with multiple nominations ===
3 nominations

- Justin Bieber
- David Guetta
- Bebe Rexha
- Bruno Mars
- Shakira

2 nominations

- Nicki Minaj
- Mark Ronson
- Taylor Swift
- Kendrick Lamar
- Rosalía
- Lil Nas X
- Karol G
- Selena Gomez
- Megan Thee Stallion
- Lady Gaga
- Ariana Grande
- Doja Cat
- The Weeknd
- Post Malone
- Metro Boomin

== See also ==
- MTV Video Music Award for Best Collaboration
