= Official Southeast Asia Charts =

Southeast Asian record charts

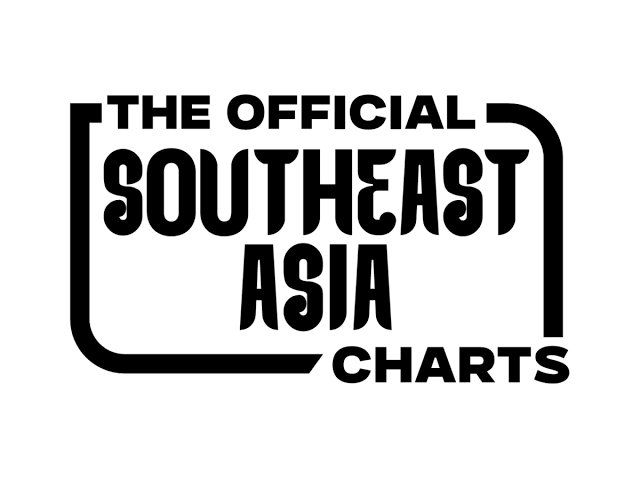
Official Southeast Asia Charts logo

The Official Southeast Asia Charts (shortened to the Official SEA Charts) are a collection of record charts launched in 2025 by the International Federation of the Phonographic Industry (IFPI). Based on data from BMAT, the charts reflect the 20 most-streamed songs in six Southeast Asian (SEA) countries: Indonesia, Malaysia, the Philippines, Singapore, Thailand, and Vietnam.

== History ==
The Official SEA Charts were launched on 23 January 2025 by the IFPI in collaboration with national music industry associations in Indonesia (ASIRI), Malaysia (RIM), Singapore (RIAS), and Thailand (TECA). The charts are rebrands of existing ones in the aforementioned four countries. Meanwhile, the Philippine and Vietnamese charts are the first industry-backed charts in those two countries.

== Charts ==
The Official SEA Charts include six charts for all songs and four top-ten charts for regional or local songs.

- Indonesia: Official Indonesia Chart
  - Official Indonesia Domestic Chart
- Malaysia: Official Malaysia Chart
  - Official Malaysia Chinese Chart
  - Official Malaysia Domestic Chart
- Philippines: Official Philippines Chart
- Singapore: Official Singapore Chart
  - Official Singapore Regional Chart
- Thailand: Official Thailand Chart
- Vietnam: Official Vietnam Chart

== Methodology ==
All charts track streams from Apple Music, Deezer, Spotify, and YouTube Music, with Indonesia charts also tracking LangitMusik. Streams are weighted to take into account differences between streams from free or paid accounts. Data from BMAT are collected weekly from Friday to Thursday, with charts of the 20 most-streamed songs published the following Tuesday on the official website and social media platforms. Music downloads and purchases of physical music do not count towards the charts, and different versions or remixes of songs are grouped together for charting purposes. To be eligible to chart, more than 30 seconds of a song must be streamed.

== See also ==
- Joox Thailand Top 100 – Thai music chart
- Philippines Hot 100 – Record chart in the Philippines
