= Thai Entertainment Content Trade Association =

Organisation that represents the interests of the recording industry

Thai Entertainment Entrepreneurs Trade Association
- Abbreviation: TECA
- Formation: 2002
- Headquarters: 17 Soi Thonglor 23, Sukhumvit 55 Road, Klongton, Watthana, Bangkok 10110, Thailand
- Location: Bangkok, Thailand
- Director: Chayapach Sangtabtim
- Website: phonorights.com

The Thai Entertainment Content Trade Association or TECA is an official company representing the recording industries of Thailand. It is also associated with the IFPI.

== Members ==
- BEC-TERO Entertainment Public Company Limited
- BEC World Public Company Limited
- Sony Music Entertainment Company Operating (Thailand) Co., Ltd.
- Universal Music (Thailand) Co., Ltd.
- Warner Music (Thailand) Co., Ltd.
- Spicy disc Co., Ltd.
- Mew Six Move Co., Ltd. / MUZIK MOVE Co., Ltd.
- What the Duck Company Limited
- KPN Music and Entertainment Co., Ltd.
- Revol Music Creation Co., Ltd
- Hitman Co., Ltd.
