= New Woman (song) =

Single by Lisa featuring Rosalía

from the album Alter Ego
- Language: English; Spanish
- Released: August 15, 2024
- Studio: Paradise Sound Recording (Los Angeles); Conway Recording (Los Angeles); Legend Music (Phuket)
- Genre: Pop; electronic; trap
- Length: 3:00
- Label: Lloud; RCA
- Songwriters: Lisa; Rosalía Vila Tobella; Max Martin; Ilya Salmanzadeh; Tove Lo; Tove Burman
- Producers: Max Martin; Ilya

Lisa singles chronology
"Rockstar" (2024)	"New Woman" (2024)	"Moonlit Floor (Kiss Me)" (2024)

Rosalía singles chronology
"Oral" (2023)	"New Woman" (2024)	"Omega" (2024)

Music video
- "New Woman" on YouTube

"New Woman" is a song by Thai rapper and singer Lisa featuring Spanish singer Rosalía. It was released through Lloud and RCA Records on August 15, 2024, as the second single from Lisa's debut studio album, Alter Ego (2025). It is primarily a pop and electronic track with trap sonorities containing lyrics about Lisa transforming herself and rediscovering her identity. The song was produced by Max Martin and Ilya and written by them alongside Lisa, Rosalía, Tove Burman, and Tove Lo.

"New Woman" received positive reviews from music critics for its catchy production and the artists' chemistry, with many naming it the best song on the album. It peaked at number 15 on the Billboard Global 200 and number six on the Global Excl. U.S., becoming Lisa's fourth and Rosalía's fifth top-ten hit on the latter chart respectively. It reached the top ten of charts in Malaysia, Singapore, and Taiwan and the top 15 in Spain, where it received a gold certification. In the United States, the song became Lisa's fourth entry on the Billboard Hot 100 at number 97 and was certified gold by the Recording Industry Association of America (RIAA).

An accompanying music video was directed by Dave Meyers and released on Lloud's YouTube channel simultaneously with the single's release. Filmed in Los Angeles, the video reflects the song's themes of empowerment and transformation and features Lisa and Rosalía in a number of high-fashion looks from the 2000s. Lisa promoted the single with performances at the 2024 MTV Video Music Awards, the Global Citizen Festival, Amazing Thailand Countdown 2025, the Coachella Valley Music and Arts Festival, and Blackpink's Deadline World Tour. "New Woman" won Best Collaboration and received a nomination for Best Video at the 2024 MTV Europe Music Awards.

== Background and release ==
After departing from her label YG Entertainment for solo activities, Lisa established her own artist management company called Lloud in February 2024 and signed with RCA Records to release solo music in partnership with Lloud in April. She released her first single under Lloud and RCA Records, "Rockstar", on June 28. On August 2, Lisa began teasing a follow-up release to "Rockstar" by posting a snippet that featured her in pink hair with a star-shaped pendant around her neck. Three days later, Lloud posted a second teaser with the same audio showing a titled silver star in front of a pink cloudy sky with the words "coming soon" followed by a rotating silvery rose and the text "LALISA ______." The blank space as well as the rose led fans to speculate that the song would be a collaboration with Spanish singer Rosalía.

The two artists had previously expressed their admiration for one another in interviews, with Rosalía calling herself a fan and praising Lisa's dancing, and Lisa praising Rosalía's Spanish cultural influences in her music. They officially announced the collaboration on August 6, revealing its title "New Woman" and its release date of August 15 at 8 p.m. ET. The announcement was accompanied by the single's cover art, which depicts Lisa and Rosalía staring sensually at the camera in their sunglasses, the former in a leather corset and jacket and the latter in a furry pink coat. "New Woman" serves as Lisa's second single from her upcoming solo album after "Rockstar", and Rosalía's first single of the year following her collaborations with Rauw Alejandro on the EP RR and Björk on the single "Oral", both released in 2023.

== Composition and lyrics ==
Lisa, Rosalía Vila Tobella, Tove Burman, Tove Lo, Ilya, and Max Martin wrote "New Woman", and the latter two produced the track. Tove Lo is also credited as a background vocalist. "New Woman" is a "Y2K-inspired" pop and electronic song with trap sonorities that runs for 3 minutes. Incorporating "industrial-styled bass, synth, and drums with filtered vocals and CD-scratching techniques in the mix", it was described as a "dance-pop anthem with a feminist flare". The song starts with Lisa singing about "walking through fire to rediscover she is a 'New Woman' with a 'revved up aura'". The singer also "talks of blooming like a flower, walking through the fire, taking her time and rediscovering herself". After the first chorus, the rhythm of "New Woman" "slows down" and is followed by Rosalía's Spanish verse with "whispered" lyrics. The two women trade verses as they step into their power, "shedding the past to embrace their evolved, untouchable selves."

== Critical reception ==
NME's Crystal Bell commended "New Woman" as a "sleek, pulsating celebration of reinvention" and Alter Ego's "standout moment", showing the "electrifying" results when Lisa "locks into a sound and a statement" on the album. Bell also praised the music video as it "amplifies the song's allure" with its depiction of Lisa as a "force of nature". Similarly, Eunbo Shim of Billboard declared it the best song on the album with the artists' "chemistry mirroring the track’s cathartic energy" as well as its music video visuals that "amplify the song’s unflinching audacity." Writing for The New York Times, Jon Caramanica praised the song's "unexpected fortitude" and acknowledged that "Rosalía’s huskiness and Lisa’s coyness are a good match." In its review, Screen Rant singled out "New Woman" as the "strongest" track of the album due to its "presenting both women in their own light with the juxtaposition of their verses coming together beautifully in the last chorus." Likewise, The Skinny's Rhys Morgan celebrated the "drumtight laidback Max Martin production" as well as Rosalía's "sharp" cameo for "adding some friction and bite." Robin Murray of Clash described the track as a "a real statement of feminine pop energy". Stereogum's Danielle Chelosky called it a "summery banger" that features "a killer beat change". Janice Sim from Singapore Vogue described it as a "sinuous, groovy track" that features "Lisa's unravelling of a new self". Pitchfork's Joshua Minsoo Kim noted that hearing Rosalía "glide in Spanish" made it "glaringly obvious" that Lisa should have explored different languages on the album such as Thai. However, Ed Power of The Irish Times derided the song as a "chemistry-lacking collaboration" that "sits in a state of inert indifference."

Rolling Stone declared "New Woman" the 70th best song of 2024 and opined that it "bangs in a late-Nineties teen-pop mode", praising the "none-more-Swedish beats" for recalling the MTV Total Request Live era and the music video that "eroticizes flip phones and fax machines." Similarly, NME named the song the 24th best K-pop song of 2024 and stated that Lisa came "guns blazing" and that all parts of the track effortlessly combine into "one of the most intoxicating fares of the year." They lauded the "artful airiness of the pre-chorus" that "flexes Lisa’s vocal chops" in a way that YG Entertainment underused, as well as Rosalía's "charismatic" feature. On the other hand, Variety's Thania Garcia called it one of the worst songs of 2024 and described it as a "collaboration that sounds great in theory, but fails in practice." She praised Lisa and Rosalía individually as "exceptional vocalist[s]" and "virtuosos" but felt that the song was "disjointed" as if the artists recorded their parts separately.

== Accolades ==
Awards and nominations for "New Woman"
Organization	Year	Award	Result	Ref.
Asian Pop Music Awards	2024	Best Collaboration (Overseas)	Nominated	
Berlin Music Video Awards	2025	Best Editor (Note: Editor: Amanda James)	Nominated	
BreakTudo Awards	2024	International Collaboration of the Year	Won	
Creative Circle Awards	2025	Best Music Video – Editing	Gold	
Hollywood Music Video Awards	2025	Best International	Won	
Hollywood Music Video Awards	2025	Best Styling	Won	
Hollywood Music Video Awards	2025	Music Video of the Year	Nominated	
Korea Grand Music Awards	2025	Best Music Video	Nominated	
MTV Europe Music Awards	2024	Best Collaboration	Won	
MTV Europe Music Awards	2024	Best Video	Nominated	

== Commercial performance ==
"New Woman" peaked at number 15 on the Billboard Global 200 dated August 31, 2024. On the Billboard Global Excl. U.S., it debuted at number six with 54.5 million streams and 10,000 sold outside the U.S. between August 16 to 22. The song marked Lisa's fourth and Rosalía's fifth top-ten hit on the chart respectively. Lisa also became the Blackpink member with the most top-tens, followed by Jennie with three and Rosé and Jisoo with one each, and matched the four top-tens that Blackpink achieved as a group. The song charted on the Global 200 for seven weeks and the Global Excl. US for ten weeks. In the United States, "New Woman" debuted at number 97 on the Billboard Hot 100, becoming Lisa's fourth entry on the chart as a soloist. She became the first female K-pop soloist in history to have four songs enter the chart, and tied J-Hope, Suga, and V as the K-pop artists with the seventh-most chart entries, only behind BTS, her group Blackpink, Jungkook, Jimin, Psy, and NewJeans.

== Music video ==
A scene in the music video of Lisa and Rosalía lying down and forming a yin and yang symbol.

An accompanying music video for "New Woman" was uploaded to Lloud's YouTube channel simultaneously with the single's release. The video was directed by Dave Meyers and filmed in Los Angeles. It garnered over 24 million views within the first 24 hours of release, surpassing Charli XCX and Billie Eilish's "Guess", which received 3.7 million views in 24 hours, as the biggest female collaboration debut on YouTube for 2024.

The video features a 2000s style and fashion, with each outfit reflecting the song's themes of empowerment and transformation. It begins with the track's title written across silver flip phones, after which Lisa comes into focus, sporting waist-length platinum hair. She struts in a sweeping black fuzzy coat worn over a blinged-out bra and matching micro-shorts, later changing into a golden chainmail outfit with wet look hair. In between solo shots of Lisa are interspersed glimpses of Rosalía, who blows pink bubblegum while wearing a fur coat. In the next scene, Lisa scans images of her face on a printer while wearing a Y2K-inspired outfit composed of a pink corset top, low-rise cargo pants and a faux fur coat, after which she dons a black feather top reminiscent of a raven. The video shifts to Rosalía for her verse, who enters wearing a red ruffled dress inspired by traditional flamenco attire with a modern twist. She then changes into another cherry red look, a body-con mini dress with patterned leggings. Lisa and Rosalía join forces for the following scene, in which the duo lie down together in contrasting white and black gowns that recall the duality of yin and yang. Lisa wears a draped, hooded halter-neck top paired with a flowing skirt, reminiscent of a mythological goddess. For the outro, the pair lounge in foldable chairs, with Lisa in an edgy 'motomami'-inspired outfit of a biker jacket, zipped corset, and a leather mini skirt, and Rosalía embodying a more "playful chic" vibe with a bubblegum pink, textured coat matched with blue sunglasses.

== Promotion and live performances ==
The day of the song's release, Lisa appeared as the first guest on the third season of Lee Young-ji's talk show Not Much Prepared on YouTube. On September 11, Lisa made her debut live performance of "New Woman" at the 2024 MTV Video Music Awards. She also performed the song as a headliner for the Global Citizen Festival, which took place on September 28. On New Year's Eve 2024, Lisa performed "New Woman" as a headliner for the Amazing Thailand Countdown 2025 event. She also performed the song at the Coachella Valley Music and Arts Festival on April 11 and 18, 2025. In 2025, "New Woman" was later included in Blackpink's Deadline World Tour setlist as a part of Lisa's solo set. Lisa included "New Woman" on the setlist of her concert residency Viva La Lisa, which ran from November 12 to 29, 2026 in Las Vegas.

== Credits and personnel ==
Credits adapted from the liner notes of Alter Ego.

Recording

- Recorded at Paradise Sound Recording (Los Angeles, California), Conway Recording Studios (Los Angeles, California), and Legend Music Studio (Phuket, Thailand)
- Engineered at Conway Studios (Los Angeles, California)
- Additional recording at MXM Studios (Stockholm, Sweden)
- Rosalía vocals engineered at Electric Lady Studios (New York City)
- Mixed at MixStar Studios (Virginia Beach, Virginia)
- Rosalía vocals mixed at Larrabee Studios (North Hollywood, California)
- Mastered at Sterling Sound (New York City)

Personnel

- Lisa – vocals, songwriter
- Rosalía – featured vocals, songwriter
- Max Martin – songwriter, producer, programming, arrangement, drums, bass, keyboards
- Ilya Salmanzadeh – songwriter, producer, programming, arrangement, drums, bass, keyboards, background vocals
- Tove Lo – songwriter, background vocals
- Tove Burman – songwriter, background vocals
- Doris Sandberg – background vocals
- Kuk Harrell – vocal producer
- Jelli Dorman – vocal engineer
- Sam Holland – engineer
- David Rodriguez – vocal engineer
- Serban Ghenea – mix engineer
- Manny Marroquin – mix engineer
- Bryce Bordone – assistant mix engineer
- Anthony Vilchis – mix assistant
- Trey Station – mix assistant
- Zach Pereyra – mix assistant
- Randy Merrill – mastering engineer

== Charts ==
Chart performance for "New Woman"
Chart (2024)	Peak position
Argentina Hot 100 (Billboard)	88
Argentina Anglo Airplay (Monitor Latino)	7
Australia (ARIA)	99
Canada Hot 100 (Billboard)	80
Central America Anglo Airplay (Monitor Latino)	2
Chile Anglo Airplay (Monitor Latino)	3
China (TME Korean)	4
Colombia Top Anglo (National Report)	3
Costa Rica Anglo Airplay (Monitor Latino)	5
Dominican Republic Anglo Airplay (Monitor Latino)	12
Ecuador Anglo Airplay (Monitor Latino)	4
El Salvador Anglo Airplay (Monitor Latino)	1
France (SNEP)	76
Germany Download (GfK)	49
Germany Streaming (GfK)	99
Global 200 (Billboard)	15
Greece International (IFPI)	95
Guatemala Anglo Airplay (Monitor Latino)	1
Honduras Anglo Airplay (Monitor Latino)	6
Hong Kong (Billboard)	17
Indonesia (ASIRI)	46
Ireland (IRMA)	83
Japan Heatseekers (Billboard Japan)	16
Lithuania (AGATA)	78
Malaysia International (RIM)	4
Mexico Anglo Airplay (Monitor Latino)	4
Netherlands (Single Tip)	8
Netherlands (Global Top 40)	3
New Zealand Hot Singles (RMNZ)	6
Nicaragua Anglo Airplay (Monitor Latino)	2
Panama (Monitor Latino)	15
Peru Anglo Airplay (Monitor Latino)	13
Philippines (Philippines Hot 100)	43
Portugal (AFP)	55
Puerto Rico Anglo Airplay (Monitor Latino)	1
Singapore (RIAS)	8
South Korea (Circle)	147
Spain (Promusicae)	12
Switzerland (Schweizer Hitparade)	62
Taiwan (Billboard)	5
UK Singles (Official Charts)	55
US Billboard Hot 100	97

== Certifications ==
Certifications for "New Woman"
Region	Certification	Certified units/sales
Brazil (Pro-Música Brasil)	2× Platinum	80,000^{‡}
Mexico (AMPROFON)	Gold	70,000^{‡}
Spain (Promusicae)	Gold	30,000^{‡}
United States (RIAA)	Gold	500,000^{‡}
^{‡} Sales+streaming figures based on certification alone.

== Release history ==
Release dates and formats for "New Woman"
Region	Date	Format	Label	Ref.
Various	August 15, 2024	Digital download; streaming	Lloud; RCA	
Italy	August 23, 2024	Radio airplay	Sony Italy	

== See also ==
- List of K-pop songs on the Billboard charts
