= Official Thailand Chart =

Record chart in Thailand

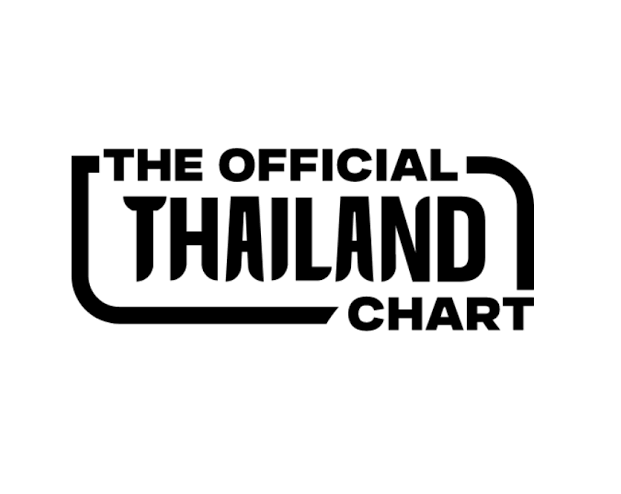
The Official Thailand Chart logo

The Official Thailand Chart is a record chart launched in 2025 by the International Federation of the Phonographic Industry (IFPI) in collaboration with the TECA. Based on data from BMAT, the chart reflects the 20 most-streamed songs in Thailand. It is a part of the Official Southeast Asia Charts, a collection of record charts by the IFPI in six Southeast Asian (SEA) countries.

== History ==
As part of the Official Southeast Asia Charts, the Official Thailand Chart was launched on 23 January 2025 by the International Federation of the Phonographic Industry (IFPI) in collaboration with Thailand's national music industry association, the Thai Entertainment Content Trade Association (TECA). The chart is a rebrand of the existing TECA Chart in Thailand. The first number-one song on the chart was the folk-rock song "Chai Pen Nai Kai Pen Bao" (ใจเป็นนาย กายเป็นบ่าว) by Lek Ratchamet for the week of 16 January 2025.

== Methodology ==
The chart tracks streams from Apple Music, Deezer, Spotify, and YouTube Music. Streams are weighted to take into account differences between streams from free or paid accounts. Data from BMAT are collected weekly from Friday to Thursday, with charts of the 20 most-streamed songs published the following Tuesday on the official website and social media platforms. Music downloads and purchases of physical music do not count towards the charts, and different versions or remixes of songs are grouped together for charting purposes. To be eligible to chart, more than 30 seconds of a song must be streamed. The data collection week runs from Friday to Thursday, with the charts released at www.officialseacharts.com and on the Official Southeast Asia Instagram and Facebook accounts the following Tuesday.

== List of number-one songs ==
=== 2025 ===
Issue date	Title	Artist(s)	Weeks	Ref.
16 January 2025	"Chai Pen Nai Kai Pen Bao"	Lek Ratchamet	1	
23 January 2025	"Yours Ever"	Cocktail	1	
30 January 2025	"Sut Tae Chai Cha Khwai Khwa"	Little John	2	
13 February 2025	"Born Again"	Lisa featuring Doja Cat and Raye	1	
20 February 2025	"Kularb"	F.Hero featuring Kantong Thungngern and Saran	16	
12 June 2025	"I'm OK Not OK"	BoydPod and Billkin	1	
19 June 2025	"Jert-jarat"	Youngohm	3	
10 July 2025	"Have a Good Time"	Blvckheart	1	
17 July 2025	"Jump"	Blackpink	1	
24 July 2025	"Sometimes"	Bowkylion featuring Nont Tanont	4	
21 August 2025	"Dream"	Lisa	1	
28 August 2025	"Sometimes"	Bowkylion featuring Nont Tanont	3	
18 September 2025	"Fak Hai Khao Rak"	Yes'sir Days	5	
23 October 2025	"Kae Bon"	Kantong Thungngern	4	
20 November 2025	"Jai Chan Tam Ter Pai"	Youngohm	5	
25 December 2025	"Dok Krachiao Ban"	Kong Huayrai	1	

=== 2026 ===
Issue date	Title	Artist(s)	Weeks	Ref.
1 January 2026	"Dok Krachiao Ban"	Kong Huayrai	4	
29 January 2026	"Fear"	Purpeech	8	
26 March 2026	"Swim"	BTS	2	
9 April 2026	"Fear"	Purpeech	14	
16 July 2026	"Sign"	Bowkylion	4	
13 August 2026	"Phro Phi Rak Ching"	Nueng BK Band	1	
20 August 2026	"Sign"	Bowkylion	2	
3 September 2026	"3 AM Call"	Mirr featuring Blvckheart	5	
8 October 2026	"Jealous"	Gavin:D	6	
