= The Daily Campus =

Student newspaper at the University of Connecticut

- Type: Daily
- Format: Broadsheet
- School: University of Connecticut
- Founder(s): John H. Evans and John N. Fitts
- Publisher: Willimantic Chronicle (1970s - Fall 2016); Hartford Courant (Fall 2016 - 2024); Connecticut Valley Publishing (2024-present)
- Editor-in-chief: Samantha Brody
- Staff: Student-led board of editors
- Founded: 1896
- Headquarters: 1266 Storrs Road, Storrs, Mansfield, CT 06269
- Circulation: 1,500
- Website: dailycampus.com

The Daily Campus, founded in 1896, is a student-run newspaper at the University of Connecticut. The weekday paper services the main campus of UConn and Storrs, Connecticut community with circulation during the school term.

Since its creation, the newspaper has undergone several name changes, having started as The Storrs Agricultural College Lookout, a monthly, when it published its first issue on May 11, 1896. The name was changed to The Connecticut Campus in 1915, followed by The Connecticut Daily Campus, and then finally The Daily Campus in 1984. It began publishing five days a week during the academic year in 1952 and became a morning paper in 1955.

The newspaper's offices are located in an outparcel building on the outskirts of the main campus adjacent to John Buckley Residence Hall, near the "Downtown Storrs" area, at the corner of 11 Dog Lane and 1266 Storrs Road (Connecticut Route 195). The paper was previously located across campus at 121 North Eagleville Road, but moved to the current location in 1992.

== History ==
=== 2015–present ===
In 2015 The Daily Campus switched to a board composed entirely of student voters, rather than the mixture of professionals (non-students) and students that have served on the board since the seventies. The decision was made after the university threatened to take away funding from the paper and the editor-in-chief at the time, with student support, agreed to the university administration's demands, citing the over $300,000 in student fees the paper is dependent upon (which account for nearly 75% of the paper's total income).

== Coverage and Operation ==
The Daily Campus splits its coverage into sections, including news, student life, sports, and opinion. Student-produced photography and comics are also published, and Associated Press national news articles may be included in the news section. It also regularly publishes special extras, usually tabloid-style inserts of approximately eight to 12 pages.

In 2014 the paper's opinion section retracted and issued an apology for a piece titled "On sexual assault, risk of overreacting."

The Daily Campus prints on weekdays, distributing 147 issues a year with a circulation of 8,000 in Storrs and some surrounding areas. Its staff is roughly 180 students.

The paper is funded primarily by fees paid by undergraduate students, in addition to advertising revenue. Financial struggles have been publicized as of 2012.

== Notable alumni ==
- Dan Drew, editor-in-chief, 2002; Mayor of Middletown, Connecticut
- Leigh Montville, editor-in-chief, 1964–1965; bestselling author
- William Ratchford
