= Bang Jae Yeob =

South Korean music video director

Bang Jae-yeob
- 방재엽
- Occupation: Film director
- Years active: 2019–present
- Known for: Music videos
- Notable work: "Sawadika"

Bang Jae-yeob (Korean: 방재엽), also romanized as Bang Jaeyeob, is a South Korean music video director. known for directing title-track music videos for the boy group Stray Kids, for whom he has directed the majority of releases since 2020, including "God's Menu", "Back Door", "Thunderous", "Maniac", "S-Class", and "Chk Chk Boom". He has also worked with various artists such as Itzy, RM, Got7, Kep1er, Zico, Crush, Ive, Lisa and WayV.

His accolades include one Melon Music Awards, a MTV Video Music Awards, three MTV Video Music Awards nominations, and two MAMA Awards nominations.

== Career ==
=== 2017–2019: Early work ===
He began directing commercials and music videos in 2018. His first music video was for the rapper Kid Milli, released in early 2018. His early clients were solo artists. In January 2019 he directed the music video for WayV's "Dream Launch".

=== 2020–present: Stray Kids and other K-pop work ===
In 2020 Bang began working with Stray Kids and went on to direct a number of the group's title-track music videos, including "God's Menu", "Back Door", "Thunderous", "Scars", "Maniac", "Circus", "The Sound", "S-Class", "Lalalala" and "Chk Chk Boom". Bang directed RM's "Still Life" (2022) and Crush's "Rush Hour" featuring J-Hope (2022), as well as Itzy's "Born to Be" and Seventeen's "F*ck My Life" (2023). His later credits include Cortis's "Fashion" and "JoyRide" and Boynextdoor's "Hollywood Action" (2025), and Ive's "Bang Bang" (2026).

== Style ==
Bang's music videos have been noted for the use of a motion-control camera rig to produce repeated or vanishing figures within a single shot, as well as rotoscoped subjects and match cuts. He reduced his use of the rig in later work, And moved to visual effects and drone shots.

== Music videos ==
Title	Year	Artist(s)	Ref(s)
"Sawadika"	2026	Lisa	
"Bang Bang"	2026	Ive	
"Lemonade"	2026	Aespa	
"Top 5"	2026	Zerobaseone	
"Nail"	2026	Yves feat. Lolo Zouaï	
"Yin and Yang"	2026	Zico × Crush	
"Crazy" (Japanese ver.)	2026	Le Sserafim	
"Gold"	2025	Itzy	
"Yum"	2025	Kep1er	
"Groundwork"	2025	KiiiKiii	
"Truman"	2025	Stray Kids (Han & Felix)	
"Chk Chk Boom"	2024	Stray Kids	
"This & That"	2024	Stray Kids	
"S-Class"	2023	Stray Kids	
"Lalalala"	2023	Stray Kids	
"The Sound"	2023	Stray Kids (Japanese release)	
"Maniac"	2022	Stray Kids	
"Still Life"	2022	RM with Anderson .Paak	
"Circus"	2022	Stray Kids (Japanese release)	
"Thunderous"	2021	Stray Kids	
"Scars"	2021	Stray Kids	
"God's Menu"	2020	Stray Kids	
"Back Door"	2020	Stray Kids	
"God's Menu" (Japanese ver.)	2020	Stray Kids	
"All In"	2020	Stray Kids	
"Astronaut"	2019	Stray Kids	
"Double Knot"	2019	Stray Kids	

== Awards and nominations ==
Year	Award	Category	Work	Result	Ref.
2026	Melon Music Awards	Best Music Video	"Bang Bang" (Ive)	Won	
2025	MTV Video Music Awards	Best K-Pop	"Chk Chk Boom" (Stray Kids)	Nominated	
2024	MTV Video Music Awards	Best K-Pop	"Lalalala" (Stray Kids)	Nominated	
2024	MAMA Awards	Best Music Video	"Heya" (Ive)	Nominated	
2023	Asian Pop Music Awards	Best Music Video	"S-Class" (Stray Kids)	Nominated	
2023	MAMA Awards	Best Music Video	"S-Class" (Stray Kids)	Nominated	
2023	MTV Video Music Awards	Best K-Pop	"S-Class" (Stray Kids)	Won	
2022	MTV Video Music Awards	Best K-Pop	"Maniac" (Stray Kids)	Nominated	
2022	Berlin Music Video Awards	Official Selection	"U" (Jadu Heart)	Silver	
