= Vevo =

American video hosting service

Vevo LLC
- Company type: Private
- Website type: Online video streaming
- Headquarters: New York City, U.S.
- Area served: Worldwide
- Owners: Equity: Alphabet Inc. Majority: Sony Music Entertainment; Universal Music Group; Warner Music Group; Minority: BMG; Independent record labels Merlin Network; ONErpm; MNRK Music Group; Vydia; Former: EMI (majority); Abu Dhabi Media (majority); MGM Holdings (minority); The Recording Academy (minority)
- Industry: Multimedia music
- Net income: US$27.0 million (2022)
- Website: hq.vevo.com
- Launched: December 8, 2009 (16 years ago)
- Current status: Available on Pluto TV, Roku, YouTube, and YouTube Music

Vevo LLC (/ˈviːvoʊ/ VEE-voh, an abbreviation for "Video Evolution", stylised in all caps until 2013) is an American multinational video hosting service, best known for providing music videos to YouTube. The service is also available as an app on selected smart TVs, digital video recorders, digital media players, and streaming television services. The service once offered a consumer mobile and tablet app; this was shut down in May 2014 to allow the service to focus on its other platforms.

The service was launched on December 8, 2009, as a joint venture among three major record companies: Universal Music Group (UMG), Sony Music Entertainment (SME), and EMI. In August 2016, Warner Music Group (WMG), the world's third-largest record company, agreed to license premium videos from its artists to Vevo.

Initially, the service hosted only music videos from UMG and SME, syndicated on YouTube and its app, and the advertising revenue was shared by Google and Vevo. Originally, WMG was reported to be considering hosting its content on the service after it launched, but formed an alliance with rival MTV Networks (now Paramount Media Networks). In August 2015, Vevo expressed renewed interest in licensing music from WMG and a deal with WMG was completed on August 2, 2016, the deal is exclusive to Vevo and does not include YouTube, where WMG continues to upload independently.

== History ==
Vevo's original wordmark, used from December 2009 until March 2013

Vevo's second logo, used from March 2013 until July 2016

The concept for Vevo was described as being a streaming service for music videos, similar to Hulu's streaming service for movies and TV shows after they air. The primary goal was to attract high-end advertisers by offering a premium platform for music videos. Vevo's revenue sources were diverse, including advertisements, a merchandise store, and referral links to purchase viewed songs on Amazon Music and iTunes. On November 20, 2008, UMG acquired the domain name vevo.com, and by June 2009, SME reached a deal to add its content to the site. Vevo officially launched on December 8, 2009, and quickly became the most visited music site in the United States, surpassing Myspace Music.

Despite its early success, Vevo faced significant challenges. In early 2013, many YouTube videos added by Vevo had their views inflated, and these inflated views were later subtracted, affecting various Vevo channels, including Lady Gaga's. Notable videos affected by this included "Just Dance," which lost more than half of its existing views, as well as "Heartless" and "Toxic." The inflation and subsequent correction of view counts raised questions about the accuracy of Vevo's metrics.

In June 2012, Vevo launched its Certified awards to honor artists whose videos achieved at least 100 million views on Vevo and its partners, including YouTube. These awards highlighted the popularity of Vevo's platform and its influence in the music industry. In 2017, Vevo saw a leadership change when CEO Erik Huggers departed, and CFO Alan Price took over as interim CEO.

In April 2018, Vevo's YouTube channel was hacked by two individuals, Prosox and Kuroi'SH, leading to the renaming of many videos and the deletion of the most viewed YouTube video, "Despacito" by Luis Fonsi.

On May 24, 2018, Vevo announced that it was shutting down its consumer website and removing its app from mobile platforms to focus on YouTube syndication. This decision marked a significant shift in Vevo's strategy, as it aimed to leverage YouTube's vast user base and infrastructure to distribute its content. Despite this change, Vevo continues to be available through various apps and devices, including YouTube, DVRs, smart TVs, gaming consoles, and streaming devices such as Roku.

In October 2020, Vevo partnered with Netherlands-based music video service Xite to further expand its reach and offerings. This partnership aimed to enhance the user experience by providing a more comprehensive and diverse selection of music videos.

=== Vevo TV ===
On March 15, 2013, Vevo launched Vevo TV, an Internet television channel running 24 hours a day, featuring blocks of music videos and specials. The channel was only available to viewers in North America and Germany, with geographical IP address blocking being used to enforce the restriction. Vevo had planned launches in other countries. After revamping its website, Vevo TV later branched off into three separate networks: Hits, Flow (hip hop and R&B), and Nashville (country music). Vevo shut down the service during the first half of 2016 as part of a site-wide redesign.

Vevo TV ran on an automated schedule, similar to video-exclusive networks run by Paramount Media Networks. Music videos would play twice within an hour and original programming, such as Top 5 Now and Vevo Lift, would air several times per day. After rebranding in 2016, Vevo TV was slowly phased out. Vevo's mobile app continued to run the channel until they were relaunched later that year.

== Availability ==
Vevo was available in Australia, Brazil, Canada, France, Germany, Ireland, Italy, Mexico, the Netherlands, New Zealand, Poland, the Philippines, Spain, the United Kingdom and the United States. The website was scheduled to go worldwide in 2010, but as of November 2025, it was still not available outside these countries. Vevo's official blog cited licensing issues for the delay in the worldwide rollout. Most of Vevo's videos on YouTube are viewable by users in other countries, while others will produce the message "The uploader has not made this video available in your country." or "This video is not available."

The Vevo service in the United Kingdom and Ireland was launched on April 26, 2011. On April 16, 2012, Vevo was launched in Australia and New Zealand by MCM Entertainment. On August 14, 2012, Brazil became the first Latin American country to have the service. It was expected to be launched in six more European and Latin American countries in 2012. Vevo launched in Spain, Italy, and France on November 15, 2012. Vevo launched in the Netherlands on April 3, 2013, and on May 17, 2013, also in Poland. On September 29, 2013, Vevo updated its iOS application that now includes launching in Germany. On April 30, 2014, Vevo was launched in Mexico.

Vevo is also available for a range of platforms including Android, iOS, Windows Phone, Windows 8, Fire OS, Google TV, Apple TV, Boxee, Roku, Xbox 360, PlayStation 3, and PlayStation 4.

In May 2018, Vevo announced that it would be discontinuing its consumer website and app on mobile platforms in order to focus on YouTube syndication. However, Vevo is still available through various apps and devices including YouTube, DVRs, smart TVs, gaming consoles and streaming devices such as Roku.

In early 2026, short vevo.ly links, which led to YouTube after Vevo's video hosting service's functionality was shut down, stopped working and was removed from video's description containing those links.

== Edited content ==
Versions of videos on Vevo with explicit content such as profanity may be edited, according to a company spokesperson, "to keep everything clean for broadcast, 'the MTV version.'" This allows Vevo to make their network more friendly to advertising partners such as McDonald's. Vevo has stated that it does not have specific policies or a list of words that are forbidden. Some explicit videos are provided with intact versions in addition to the edited version. There is no formal rating system in place, aside from classifying videos as explicit or non-explicit, but discussions are taking place to create a rating system that allows both users and advertisers to choose the level of profanity they are willing to accept.

== 24-Hour Vevo Record ==
The 24-Hour Vevo Record, commonly referred to as the Vevo Record, is the record for the most views a music video associated with Vevo has received within 24 hours of its release. The video that currently holds this record is Lisa's "Sawadika" with 70.8 million views.

In 2012, Nicki Minaj's "Stupid Hoe" became one of the first Vevo music videos to receive a significant amount of media attention upon its release day, during which it accumulated around 4.8 million views. The record has consistently been kept track of by Vevo ever since. Total views of a video are counted from across all of Vevo's platforms, including YouTube, Yahoo! and other syndication partners. On April 14, 2013, Psy's "Gentleman" unofficially broke the record by reaching 38.4 million views in its first 24 hours. However, Vevo did not acknowledge this record because it was not associated with them until four days after its release to YouTube.

On August 19, 2014, Minaj broke the record with her "Anaconda" video which garnered 19.7 million views. Swift broke the record with "Bad Blood" with 20.1 million views, on May 17, 2015, which was later surpassed by Adele's "Hello", which received 27.7 million views in first 24 hours.

On August 28, 2017, both YouTube and Vevo records were eclipsed by Swift again, with "Look What You Made Me Do", which gained 43.2 million views in 24 hours. On December 1, 2018, Ariana Grande's "Thank U, Next" broke the record, accumulating 55.4 million views in 24 hours. Swift then regained the record on April 27, 2019, when her video for "Me!" garnered 65.2 million views in first 24 hours. Swift's channel is the first and only to break the record three times. Lisa broke Swift's reign with the release of her single "Sawadika", boasting 70.8 million views in the first 24 hours of its release. This music video marks Lisa's first music video associated with Vevo. While her 2021 release "Lalisa" boasted a higher view count on its first day (73.6 million), the aforementioned video was not released with Vevo, making it ineligible for the Vevo record. One Direction, Justin Bieber, Nicki Minaj, and Miley Cyrus, have all broken the record twice (Minaj would have tied Swift if features were included in the count).

=== Record holders ===
List of Vevo videos which held the record for most views in their first 24 hours online

Video name	Artist(s)	Views (millions)	Days held	Date achieved	Ref(s)
"Sawadika"	Lisa	70.8	69	September 3, 2026
"Me!"	Taylor Swift featuring Brendon Urie	65.2	2,687	April 26, 2019
"Thank U, Next"	Ariana Grande	55.4	147	November 30, 2018
"Look What You Made Me Do"	Taylor Swift	43.2	461	August 27, 2017
"Hello"	Adele	27.7	674	October 23, 2015
"Bad Blood"	Taylor Swift featuring Kendrick Lamar	20.1	158	May 17, 2015
"Anaconda"	Nicki Minaj	19.7	271	August 19, 2014
"Wrecking Ball"	Miley Cyrus	19.3	344	September 9, 2013
"Best Song Ever"	One Direction	12.3	48	July 23, 2013
"We Can't Stop"	Miley Cyrus	10.7	82	June 19, 2013
"Beauty and a Beat"	Justin Bieber featuring Nicki Minaj	10.6	250	October 12, 2012
"Live While We're Young"	One Direction	8.3	22	September 20, 2012
"Boyfriend"	Justin Bieber	8.0	140	May 3, 2012
"Where Have You Been"	Rihanna	4.9	3	April 30, 2012
"Stupid Hoe"	Nicki Minaj	4.8	74	January 20, 2012
As of November 10, 2026

== Vevo Certified ==
Vevo Certified logo

The Vevo Certified Award is given from Vevo to artists with over 100 million views on Vevo and its partners (including YouTube) through special features on the Vevo website. It was launched in June 2012.

=== Artists with the most Vevo Certified videos ===
Artists with 20 or more Vevo Certified music videos. All lead and co-lead appearances are counted towards the artists' total, regardless of the Vevo channel on which it appears. Featured appearances (featuring, feat., ft. etc.) are not counted.

Rank	Artist	Certified videos	Ref(s)
1.	Shakira	53	
2.	Taylor Swift	51	
3.	J Balvin	49	
4.	Chris Brown	45	
5.	Justin Bieber	42	
6.	Maluma	41	
6.	Ariana Grande	41	
8.	Karol G	40	
9.	Rihanna	38	
10.	Beyoncé	37	
10.	Eminem	37	
12.	Michael Jackson	36	
13.	The Weeknd	33	
14.	Lady Gaga	32	
14.	Selena Gomez	32	
14.	Nicki Minaj	32	
17.	Maroon 5	30	
18.	Britney Spears	28	
19.	Enrique Iglesias	26	
19.	Katy Perry	26	
19.	Romeo Santos	26	
22.	Mariah Carey	25	
23.	Billie Eilish	24	
23.	Pink	24	
25.	Jennifer Lopez	23	
25.	Miley Cyrus	23	
27.	Calvin Harris	22	
27.	Drake	22	
27.	Imagine Dragons	22	
30.	Anuel AA	21	
31.	Black Eyed Peas	20	
31.	Demi Lovato	20	
As of November 11, 2026

== See also ==
- Music on demand
- Digital media certification
- List of most-viewed YouTube videos
- YouTube
