= List of Planet C: Home Race contestants =

Planet C: Home Race is a spin-off of South Korean reality competition series, Boys II Planet, where 18 Planet C contestants who were previously eliminated from the base show competed again to debut in a seven-member boy group. After the final episode, the final top seven contestants were selected to debut as members of the global-Chinese boy group Modyssey.

== Contestants ==
The English names of contestants are presented in Eastern order in accordance with the official website.

The ages of all contestants are presented in accordance with the international age system as of Episode 1 (December 6, 2025).

Key

Final members of Modyssey
Contestants eliminated in the final episode
Contestants eliminated in the first elimination round
Contestants that left the show
Top Contestant

Company	Contestant (Note: All the contestants were contestants on Boys II Planet)	Age (Note: As of Episode 1 (December 6, 2025), added new age if contestant is still in the show during their birthday)	Ranking									
Company	Contestant	Age	Initial Grade (Note: Decided through vote)	Ep. 1 (Note: 1st Global Vote Interim Status)	Episode 3					Ep. 4		Final
Company	Contestant	Age	Initial Grade	#	Votes		Points	#	Grade	Points	#	Final
Company	Contestant	Age	Initial Grade	#	Korean	Global	Points	#	Grade	Points	#	Final
Individual Trainee (개인연습생)	Sun Hengyu (孙亨裕) / (쑨헝위) (Note: Sun Hengyu is a former member of Blank2y.)	24	Top	1	373,467	2,733,069	5,643,012	1	Top	10,063,265	1	1
Individual Trainee (개인연습생)	Fan Zheyi (范哲逸) / (판저이)	19	Mid	2	415,367	2,264,245	5,358,339	2	Top	7,723,581	2	2
NCC Entertainment	Li Zihao (李梓豪) / (리즈하오) (Note: Jia Hanyu and Li Zihao are members of Boy Story.)	21	Top	3	299,036	2,643,935	5,057,545	3	Top	5,298,807	3	3
IX Entertainment (IX 엔터테인먼트)	Zhao Guangxu (Note: Full Name: Zhào Yángguāngxù (赵杨光旭)) (赵光旭) / (자오광쉬) (Note: Xie Binghua, Yi Chen and Zhao Guangxu were contestants on Project 7.)	22	Top	5	221,595	1,842,524	3,609,663	5	Top	5,205,984	4	4
Individual Trainee (개인연습생)	Xue Suren (Note: Full Name: Xue Yongyi (薛永希)) (薛苏仁) / (쉬에수런) (Note: Xue Suren was a contestant on Under Nineteen.)	21	Top	4	302,459	1,281,554	3,467,194	6	Top	4,509,657	5	5
Wake One Entertainment (웨이크원)	Yi Chen (Note: Full Name: Jīn Yǒngxiān (金永先)) (亦辰) / (이첸) (Note: Yi Chen was a contestant on Youth With You.)	27	Top	7	219,408	1,034,334	2,639,040	7	Mid	4,349,467	6	6
Individual Trainee (개인연습생)	Ngan Chau-yuet (顏秋越) / (안차우윗) (Note: Ngan Chauyuet was a contestant on Starlight Boys.)	23	Low	8	286,965	432,025	2,361,833	8	Mid	4,283,965	7	7
Individual Trainee (개인연습생)	Hu Hanwen (胡瀚文) / (후한원)	24-25	Top	6	344,385	1,281,981	3,738,063	4	Top	Not Shown	8	8
Dongyo Entertainment (동요엔터테인멘트)	Dang Hong Hai (Đặng Hồng Hải) / (당홍하이) (Note: Dang Hong Hai was a contestant on Boys Planet.)	22	Mid	12	122,199	992,615	1,962,803	9	Mid	Not Shown		9
Individual Trainee (개인연습생)	Lim Jack (임잭)	19	Mid	11	121,688	617,814	1,515,919	11	Mid	Not Shown		10
Wake One Entertainment (웨이크원)	Ko Ming-chieh (柯茗傑) / (커밍지에)	18	Low	16	44,313	203,777	526,933	16	Mid	Not Shown		11
RYCE Entertainment	Chrisen Yang (Note: Full Name: Yáng Qísēn (杨淇森)) (克里森 杨) / (크리센 양)	20	Low	15	44,550	201,567	525,845	17	Mid	Not Shown		12
Individual Trainee (개인연습생)	Chen Bowen (陈博文) / (천보원)	17	Mid	9	Not Shown			10	Low	Eliminated		13
RND Company (알앤디컴퍼니)	Xie Binghua (谢秉桦) / (시에빙화)	23	Mid	10	Not Shown			12	Low	Eliminated		14
NCC Entertainment	Jia Hanyu (贾涵予) / (지아한위)	21	Mid	13	Not Shown			13	Low	Eliminated		15
Dragon Team Film and Television Culture	Zhang Shunyu (张舜禹) / (장슌위)	15	Low	14	Not Shown			14	Low	Eliminated		16
YS Group (와이에스그룹)	Wong Sik-hei (黃錫熙) / (왕식헤이)	16	Low	17	Not Shown			15	Low	Eliminated		17
Individual Trainee (개인연습생)	Chen Zishuo (陈凯文) / (천즈슈어)	22	Low	18	Not Shown			18	Low	Eliminated		18

== Producing Battle (Episode 1-2) ==
This first part of this mission would have the songs, the killing part contestants, and creative missions for each performance decided by the public audience through Boost Missions. The first Boost Mission for the public audience was choosing one out each pair of hit tracks presented to them, for three given artists. They were presented with the following choices: Armageddon or Drama by aespa, Hello Future or ISTJ by NCT Dream, and Clap or Hot by Seventeen. This Boost Mission took place from October 29, to November 1, 2025. Once the three songs were decided, the second Boost Mission was to assign contestants for the killing parts of the three selected songs. This Boost Mission took place from November 2, to November 5, 2025. Once the three killing part contestants were announced to all the contestants, the killing part contestants took turns building their teams, starting from first place, down to third place, in alternating order. Once the teams were decided, each team would decide the parts for their team. After the parts were decided, if any contestant were unsatisfied with their part, they would have the chance to switch teams. After any switches, the teams would continue practicing with their new members. The third Boost Mission for the public audience was to assign Creative Missions to each song. They had to choose between an Acrobatic Performance Creation, a Pair Choreography Creation, and a Harmony Part Creation, assigning one to each of the three performances. This Boost Mission took place on November 6 and 7, 2025. These hidden missions were presented to the contestants midway through practicing. The second part of this mission would have two contestants selected from each team, by the members themselves, come together to make one performance. The fourth Boost Mission for the public audience was to select choreography created by the two contestants from each team, for God's Menu by Stray Kids, which would determine the Killing Part and the choreography used for that performance. This Boost Mission took place from November 14, to November 16, 2025. The winning team order would be calculated by adding the individual scores and the team scores from the first team battle, and the unit scores from the Team Ace Battle. The overall winning team from the two battles would have all their members survive to the next round, with the second place team having half of their members survive and the other half becoming elimination candidates, and all the contestants on the last place team becoming elimination candidates as well.

Key

Killing Part
Leader and Killing Part
Winning Team (Note: Per Battle)

Producing Battle
1st Team Battle
#	Performance			Team Rank		Contestants		
#	Song	Original Artist(s)	Creative Mission	Initial (Note: After 1st Team Battle)	Overall (Note: After Team Ace Battle)	Rank	Position	Name
2	Hot	Seventeen	Acrobatic; Performance	3	3	2	Main Vocal	Zhao Guangxu
2	Hot	Seventeen	Acrobatic; Performance	3	3	6	Sub Vocal 1	Wong Sik-hei
2	Hot	Seventeen	Acrobatic; Performance	3	3	4	Sub Vocal 2	Jia Hanyu
2	Hot	Seventeen	Acrobatic; Performance	3	3	1	Sub Vocal 3	Xue Suren
2	Hot	Seventeen	Acrobatic; Performance	3	3	3	Main Rapper	Yi Chen
2	Hot	Seventeen	Acrobatic; Performance	3	3	5	Sub Rapper	Zhang Shunyu
3	Drama	aespa	Pair; Choreography	1	2	4	Main Vocal	Chen Bowen
3	Drama	aespa	Pair; Choreography	1	2	1	Sub Vocal 1	Fan Zheyi (Note: Fan Zheyi was initially in ISTJ and Dang Hong Hai was initially in Drama, but they switched teams midway through preparations.)
3	Drama	aespa	Pair; Choreography	1	2	3	Sub Vocal 2	Hu Hanwen
3	Drama	aespa	Pair; Choreography	1	2	5	Sub Vocal 3	Xie Binghua
3	Drama	aespa	Pair; Choreography	1	2	2	Main Rapper	Li Zihao
3	Drama	aespa	Pair; Choreography	1	2	6	Sub Rapper	Chen Zishuo
1	ISTJ	NCT Dream	Harmony; Part	2	1	1	Main Vocal	Sun Hengyu
1	ISTJ	NCT Dream	Harmony; Part	2	1	4	Sub Vocal 1	Dang Hong Hai
1	ISTJ	NCT Dream	Harmony; Part	2	1	2	Sub Vocal 2	Ngan Chau-yuet
1	ISTJ	NCT Dream	Harmony; Part	2	1	6	Sub Vocal 3	Ko Ming-chieh
1	ISTJ	NCT Dream	Harmony; Part	2	1	5	Main Rapper	Chrisen Yang
1	ISTJ	NCT Dream	Harmony; Part	2	1	3	Sub Rapper	Lim Jack
Team Ace Battle (2nd Team Battle)
4	God's Menu (神메뉴)	Stray Kids					Main Vocal	Xue Suren
4	God's Menu (神메뉴)	Stray Kids					Sub Vocal 1	Hu Hanwen
4	God's Menu (神메뉴)	Stray Kids					Sub Vocal 2	Ngan Chau-yuet
4	God's Menu (神메뉴)	Stray Kids					Main Rapper	Li Zihao
4	God's Menu (神메뉴)	Stray Kids					Sub Rapper 1	Sun Hengyu
4	God's Menu (神메뉴)	Stray Kids					Sub Rapper 2	Zhao Guangxu

== Debut Mission (Episode 3-4) ==
Key

Killing Part
Killing Part Candidate
Leader
Leader and Killing Part

Final Debut Battle
Performance		#	Contestants	
Song	Production Credit	#	Position	Name
REVENANT (레버넌트)	Lyrics: SEORA; Composition: Lee Hae-sol, Albin Nordqvist; Arrangement: Lee Hae-sol	1	Main Vocal	Hu Hanwen
REVENANT (레버넌트)	Lyrics: SEORA; Composition: Lee Hae-sol, Albin Nordqvist; Arrangement: Lee Hae-sol	1	Sub Vocal 1	Sun Hengyu
REVENANT (레버넌트)	Lyrics: SEORA; Composition: Lee Hae-sol, Albin Nordqvist; Arrangement: Lee Hae-sol	1	Sub Vocal 2	Yi Chen
REVENANT (레버넌트)	Lyrics: SEORA; Composition: Lee Hae-sol, Albin Nordqvist; Arrangement: Lee Hae-sol	1	Sub Vocal 3	Ko Ming-chieh
REVENANT (레버넌트)	Lyrics: SEORA; Composition: Lee Hae-sol, Albin Nordqvist; Arrangement: Lee Hae-sol	1	Main Rapper	Li Zihao
REVENANT (레버넌트)	Lyrics: SEORA; Composition: Lee Hae-sol, Albin Nordqvist; Arrangement: Lee Hae-sol	1	Sub Rapper	Chrisen Yang
REVENANT (레버넌트)	Lyrics: SEORA; Composition: Lee Hae-sol, Albin Nordqvist; Arrangement: Lee Hae-sol	2	Main Vocal	Fan Zheyi
REVENANT (레버넌트)	Lyrics: SEORA; Composition: Lee Hae-sol, Albin Nordqvist; Arrangement: Lee Hae-sol	2	Sub Vocal 1	Dang Hong Hai
REVENANT (레버넌트)	Lyrics: SEORA; Composition: Lee Hae-sol, Albin Nordqvist; Arrangement: Lee Hae-sol	2	Sub Vocal 2	Ngan Chau-yuet
REVENANT (레버넌트)	Lyrics: SEORA; Composition: Lee Hae-sol, Albin Nordqvist; Arrangement: Lee Hae-sol	2	Sub Vocal 3	Zhao Guangxu
REVENANT (레버넌트)	Lyrics: SEORA; Composition: Lee Hae-sol, Albin Nordqvist; Arrangement: Lee Hae-sol	2	Main Rapper	Xue Suren
REVENANT (레버넌트)	Lyrics: SEORA; Composition: Lee Hae-sol, Albin Nordqvist; Arrangement: Lee Hae-sol	2	Sub Rapper	Lim Jack
