= Viva La Lisa =

Concert residency by Lisa

- Residency by Lisa
- Promotional poster
- Location: Paradise, Nevada, United States
- Venue: The Colosseum at Caesars Palace
- Associated album: Press Play
- Start date: November 12, 2026
- End date: November 29, 2026
- Legs: 1
- No. of shows: 6

Lisa concert chronology
- Fan Meetup in Asia (2024); Viva La Lisa (2026)

Viva La Lisa is a concert residency by Thai rapper and singer Lisa. Performed at The Colosseum at Caesars Palace on the Las Vegas Strip in Paradise, Nevada, the residency began on November 12, 2026 and is scheduled to end on November 29, 2026. It is the first Las Vegas residency by a K-pop artist in history.

== Background and development ==
In November 2024, Lisa embarked on the Fan Meetup in Asia tour ahead of her debut studio album Alter Ego (2025). Following the release of the album in February 2025, she performed her first solo set at the 2025 Coachella Valley Music and Arts Festival in April. On October 22, it was announced that Lisa signed with the booking agency Wasserman Music for touring representation globally.

Lisa announced her first concert residency in Las Vegas on March 30, 2026. Running for two weekends, she will perform six shows on November 12, 13, 14, 27, 28 and 29 at The Colosseum at Caesars Palace. With this, Lisa became the first K-pop artist to stage a Las Vegas residency in history.

== Commercial performance ==
The artist presale began on April 22, while general tickets went on sale April 23. Tickets for all four dates sold out within 10 minutes of the general on sale. In response to overwhelming demand, Lisa added two more dates on November 12 and 29, which went on sale on September 30.

== Set list ==
This is the set list for the show on November 12, 2026. It may not represent all shows.

Chapter 1

1. "Tarantino"
2. "Fxck Up the World"
3. "V12"
4. "Badgrrrl"
5. "Rockstar"

Chapter 2

6. "Sweat"
7. "Elastigirl"
8. "Goals"
9. "Rapunzel"
10. "Money"

Chapter 3

11. "Chill"
12. "Moonlit Floor (Kiss Me)"
13. "Dream"
14. "When I'm with You"
15. "Born Again"

Chapter 4

16. "Cut U Off"
17. "Cobra"
18. "New Woman"
19. "Leave with Me"

Chapter 5

20. "Thunder"
21. "Bad Angel"
22. "Lifestyle"
23. "Sawadika"
