= Goals (song) =

Single by Lisa, Anitta, and Rema

from the album Official FIFA World Cup 2026 Album
- Language: English; Spanish; Portuguese
- Released: May 21, 2026
- Genre: Latin pop; K-pop; Afrobeats
- Length: 3:00
- Label: SALXCO
- Songwriters: Larissa de Macedo Machado; Divine Ikubor; Andre Murilo da Silva; Bava; Henry Walter; José Henrique Castanho de Godoy Pinheiro; Kyle Buckley; Ricardo Andrés Fagundo; Risa Oribe
- Producers: Bava; Cirkut; PinkSlip; Tropkillaz

Lisa singles chronology
"Bad Angel" (2026)	"Goals" (2026)	"Sawadika" (2026)

Anitta singles chronology
"Choka Choka" (2026)	"Goals" (2026)	"Loca" (2026)

Rema singles chronology
"Who's Dat Girl" (2025)	"Goals" (2026)	"Tea" (2026)

2026 FIFA World Cup singles chronology
"Dai Dai" (2026)	"Goals" (2026)	"Game Time" (2026)

Music video
- "Goals" on YouTube

"Goals" is a song by Thai rapper and singer Lisa, Brazilian singer Anitta, and Nigerian singer Rema. It was released through SALXCO Records on May 21, 2026, as the sixth single from the official album of the 2026 FIFA World Cup. Produced by Bava, Cirkut, PinkSlip, and Tropkillaz, it is a cross-cultural collaboration that blends Latin pop, K-pop, and Afrobeats influences. Lisa performed "Goals" at the 2026 FIFA World Cup opening ceremony with Anitta and Rema as well as her concert residency Viva La Lisa.

== Background and release ==
In March 2026, a registration with the ASCAP revealed a track titled "Goals" crediting Anitta, Lisa, Rema, and the Brazilian production duo Tropkillaz as performers and FIFA itself as a composer. Speculation that the song would be part of the 2026 FIFA World Cup soundtrack began circulating immediately. On May 19, 2026, Anitta officially announced the collaboration and released a teaser of the song on her social media. "Goals" released on May 21, 2026; the track will be part of the Official FIFA World Cup 2026 Album.

== Composition and lyrics ==
"Goals" was produced by Grammy Award-winning producer Cirkut, Bava, PinkSlip, as well as the Brazilian production duo Tropkillaz, who previously worked with both Lisa and Anitta. The collaboration brings together three international acts, with Lisa representing Asia, Anitta representing Latin America, and Rema representing Africa. The song reflects a multilingual and cross-cultural approach, drawing from three continents' worth of cultural influences. Anitta performs in English, Spanish, and Portuguese on the track.

The song has been described as a fusion of Latin pop, K-pop, and Afrobeats, combining fast-paced K-pop elements with Brazilian funk-influenced beats and Afrobeats-style percussion. It has been noted for its energetic tone and percussion-driven production, with each artist bringing their own dynamic flair. FIFA characterized "Goals" as a genre-blending record that moves beyond any single sound or region.

The track features a "relentless, hypnotic" hook built around the lyric "Yes, I’m goals". It is structured to highlight each artist in sequence, beginning with Lisa, followed by Anitta, and concluding with a rap verse from Rema. Lyrically, the song uses football imagery as a metaphor for ambition and perseverance, with lines such as "I got goals, I got dreams, I got visions" emphasizing themes of success and self-confidence.

== Music video ==
An accompanying music video for "Goals" was directed by Chris Villa and released alongside the single on YouTube. Set inside a football cage, the clip intersperses scenes of the artists with footage of intense football matches, with local players freestyling, dribbling, and showcasing the game's street culture. Lisa begins the video as she dances wearing a yellow jersey and blue shorts. It then transitions to Anitta performing in a football field surrounded by blue flames, ending with Rema rapping in a smoky, red-tinted room.

== Live performances ==
Lisa, Anitta, and Rema performed "Goals" for the first time live as headliners for the 2026 FIFA World Cup opening ceremony, which took place on June 12, 2026 at SoFi Stadium in Los Angeles. The performance made Lisa the first female K-pop act and the first Thai artist to headline a FIFA opening ceremony in history.

== Credits and personnel ==
Credits adapted from Tidal.

- Lisa – vocals
- Anitta – vocals, songwriter
- Rema – vocals, songwriter
- Bava – songwriter, producer, background vocalist
- Cirkut – songwriter, producer, engineer, drum, programming
- PinkSlip – songwriter, producer, engineer, bass, piano, programming
- Tropkillaz – co-producer
  - Andre Murilo da Silva – songwriter
  - José Henrique Castanho de Godoy Pinheiro – songwriter
- Ricardo Andrés Fagundo – songwriter
- Risa Oribe – songwriter
- Robert Palma – engineer
- Randy Merrill – mastering engineer
- Serban Ghenea – mix engineer

== Charts ==
Weekly chart performance
Chart (2026)	Peak position
Central America Anglo Airplay (Monitor Latino)	17
Ecuador Anglo Airplay (Monitor Latino)	11
El Salvador Anglo Airplay (Monitor Latino)	9
Global K-Songs (Billboard Korea)	41
Honduras Anglo Airplay (Monitor Latino)	2
New Zealand Hot Singles (RMNZ)	34
Nicaragua Anglo Airplay (Monitor Latino)	5
Nigeria (TurnTable Top 100)	62
Nigeria Airplay (TurnTable)	30
South Korea Download (Circle)	157
Uruguay Anglo Airplay (Monitor Latino)	15
Venezuela Anglo Airplay (Monitor Latino)	11

== Release history ==
Release dates and formats
Region	Date	Format	Label	Ref.
Various	May 21, 2026	Digital download; streaming	SALXCO	

== See also ==
- List of FIFA World Cup songs and anthems
