= List of number-one songs of 2026 (Singapore) =

This is a list of the Official Singapore Chart number-one songs in 2026, according to the Recording Industry Association Singapore.

== Chart history ==
Issue Date	Song	Artist(s)	Ref.
1 January	"Golden"	Huntrix	
8 January	"The Fate of Ophelia"	Taylor Swift	
15 January	"The Fate of Ophelia"	Taylor Swift	
22 January	"The Fate of Ophelia"	Taylor Swift	
29 January	"The Fate of Ophelia"	Taylor Swift	
5 February	"Don’t Say You Love Me"	Jin	
12 February	"DTMF"	Bad Bunny	
19 February	"Don’t Say You Love Me"	Jin	
26 February	"The Fate of Ophelia"	Taylor Swift	
5 March	"Risk It All"	Bruno Mars	
12 March	"Risk It All"	Bruno Mars	
19 March	"Risk It All"	Bruno Mars	
26 March	"Swim"	BTS	
2 April	"Swim"	BTS	
9 April	"Swim"	BTS	
16 April	"Swim"	BTS	
23 April	"Beauty and a Beat"	Justin Bieber	
30 April	"Beauty and a Beat"	Justin Bieber	
7 May	"Swim"	BTS	
14 May	"Swim"	BTS	
21 May	"Swim"	BTS	
28 May	"The Cure"	Olivia Rodrigo	
4 June	“Hate That I Made You Love Me”	Ariana Grande	
11 June	“Hate That I Made You Love Me”	Ariana Grande	
18 June	“Hate That I Made You Love Me”	Ariana Grande	
25 June	“Hate That I Made You Love Me”	Ariana Grande	
2 July	“Hate That I Made You Love Me”	Ariana Grande	
9 July	“Hate That I Made You Love Me”	Ariana Grande	
16 July	“Hate That I Made You Love Me”	Ariana Grande	
23 July	“Hate That I Made You Love Me”	Ariana Grande	
30 July	“Hate That I Made You Love Me”	Ariana Grande	
6 August	“Hate That I Made You Love Me”	Ariana Grande	
13 August	“Hate That I Made You Love Me”	Ariana Grande	
20 August	“Hate That I Made You Love Me”	Ariana Grande	
27 August	“Hate That I Made You Love Me”	Ariana Grande	
3 September	“Hate That I Made You Love Me”	Ariana Grande	
10 September	“Hate That I Made You Love Me”	Ariana Grande	
17 September	"Sawadika"	Lisa	
24 September	"Ain't in LA"	Adéla	
1 October	"Patient Zero"	Taylor Swift	
8 October	"Nicole Kidman"	Adéla	
15 October	"Nicole Kidman"	Adéla	
22 October	"Housewife"	Tate McRae	
29 October	"Housewife"	Tate McRae	
5 November	"Housewife"	Tate McRae	
12 November	"Housewife"	Tate McRae	

== Number-one artists ==
List of number-one artists by total weeks at number one
Position	Artist	Weeks at No. 1
1	Ariana Grande	15
2	BTS	7
3	Taylor Swift	6
4	Tate McRae	4
5	Adéla	3
5	Bruno Mars	3
7	Jin	2
7	Justin Bieber	2
9	Bad Bunny	1
9	Huntrix	1
9	Lisa	1
9	Olivia Rodrigo	1
