= Always Lalisa =

2026 documentary film

- Theatrical release poster
- Directed by: Sue Kim
- Produced by: Sue Kim; Courtney Crockett
- Starring: Lalisa Manobal
- Cinematography: Emily Topper
- Edited by: Ezra Paek
- Music by: Aska Matsumiya
- Production companies: Sony Music Vision; Tremolo Productions; Salt Water Productions; Lloud
- Distributed by: Sony Music Vision; Trafalgar Releasing
- Release dates: September 11, 2026 (TIFF); October 12, 2026
- Running time: 98 minutes
- Country: United States
- Languages: English; Thai; Korean

Always Lalisa is a 2026 American documentary film directed by Sue Kim, featuring Thai rapper and singer Lisa. The film follows a year in Lisa's life as she pursues a solo career independently of her group Blackpink. It premiered on September 11, 2026 at the 2026 Toronto International Film Festival and had a limited theatrical release in IMAX and cinemas worldwide beginning October 12, 2026, before streaming exclusively on YouTube Premium on November 18, 2026.

== Synopsis ==
Always Lalisa follows Lisa as she steps away from her group Blackpink for a full year of independence for the first time since childhood. She navigates the challenges of launching a solo career, pursuing acting, and building her brand while maintaining her personal life.

== Cast ==
- Lalisa Manobal

== Production ==
On May 29, 2025, Sony Music Vision announced that a documentary film about Lisa was in production, with Sue Kim directing. The announcement was made during a Sony Music Vision presentation in Hollywood for the company's slate of music film projects, during which a trailer for the film was shown to industry professionals. Kim said she spent a year working with Lisa on the film and that it would show aspects of her life that audiences had not previously seen in her career. She shared that during their first meeting, Lisa contacted a friend group from her pre-fame days and invited them to participate in the documentary.

== Release ==
On July 20, 2026, Sony Music Vision announced the film's title as Always Lalisa and that it would have its world premiere in the Gala programme at the 2026 Toronto International Film Festival. On August 11, the film's release date was announced on the festival's website as September 11, 2026. On September 2, Sony Music Vision revealed that the film will open in IMAX and cinemas worldwide for a limited engagement beginning October 12, before its release on YouTube Premium. On November 2, it was announced Always Lalisa will release on YouTube Premium on November 18, as well as a new single "Leave with Me" made for and featured in the documentary.
