= Leave with Me =

2026 single by Lisa

Single by Lisa
- Released: November 18, 2026
- Genre: Ballad
- Length: 3:05
- Label: Lloud; RCA
- Songwriters: Lisa; Ali Tamposi; Feli Ferraro; Shintaro Yasuda; Tyler Spry
- Producers: Shintaro Yasuda; Tyler Spry

Lisa singles chronology
| "Tarantino" (2026) | "Leave with Me" (2026) |

Music video
- "Leave with Me" on YouTube

"Leave with Me" is a song by Thai rapper and singer Lisa. It was released through Lloud and RCA Records on November 18, 2026, alongside the streaming debut of the documentary film Always Lalisa (2026), where it played over the closing credits. It was written by Lisa with Ali Tamposi, Feli Ferraro, Shintaro Yasuda, and Tyler Spry, while production was handled by the latter two.

== Background and release ==
"Leave with Me" was created for the closing credits of the documentary film Always Lalisa, which premiered on September 11, 2026 at the 2026 Toronto International Film Festival and had a limited theatrical release on October 12. On November 10, it was announced that the song would be released on November 18 at the same time as the documentary's streaming debut on YouTube Premium.

== Composition and lyrics ==
"Leave with Me" was co-written by Lisa along with Ali Tamposi, Feli Ferraro, Shintaro Yasuda and Tyler Spry. It is an emotional ballad that opens with an acoustic guitar and features a slow-motion drum beat and sparse arrangement. Contrasting with Lisa's high-energy sound in her previous releases, the track showcases a more reflective side of the singer and explores themes of personal growth and perseverance through life's changes. Lisa contemplates about taking flight on her own to seek new adventures and thanks her ex for letting her go so she can find where she truly belongs, singing "No hard feelings / You can come or stay / Either way, I'mma leave with me."

== Music video ==
An accompanying music video was released alongside the single. It features footage from Always Lalisa, including live performances, backstage moments, childhood memories, and scenes from Lisa's personal life.

== Live performances ==
Lisa made her live performance debut of "Leave with Me" on her concert residency Viva La Lisa, which ran from November 12 to 29 in Las Vegas.

== Credits and personnel ==
Credits adapted from Tidal.

- Lisa – vocals, songwriter
- Shintaro Yasuda – songwriter, producer
- Tyler Spry – songwriter, producer
- Ali Tamposi – songwriter
- Feli Ferraro – songwriter
- Kuk Harrell – vocal producer
- Shawn Everett – mixing engineer
- Randy Merrill – mastering engineer

== Release history ==
Release dates and formats
| Region | Date | Format | Label | Ref. |
|---|---|---|---|---|
| Various | November 18, 2026 | Digital download; streaming | Lloud; RCA | |
