= Sawadika =

2026 single by Lisa

Single by Lisa

from the EP Press Play
- Language: English; Thai
- English title: "Hello"
- Released: September 3, 2026
- Studio: Westlake Recording (West Hollywood)
- Genre: Hip-hop
- Length: 3:08
- Label: Lloud; RCA
- Songwriters: Lisa; Thom Bridges; Mark Williams; Raul Cubina; Rachel West; Danny Chung
- Producers: Thom Bridges; Ojivolta

Lisa singles chronology
"Goals" (2026)	"Sawadika" (2026)	"Tarantino" (2026)

Music video
- "Sawadika" on YouTube

"Sawadika" (stylized as "SaWaDiKa"; transl. "Hello") is a song by Thai rapper and singer Lisa. It was released through Lloud and RCA Records on September 3, 2026, as the lead single from her first extended play, Press Play (2026). The song was written by Lisa with Thom Bridges, Ojivolta, Rachel West, and Danny Chung, with the former two handling the production. It is a hip-hop track that pays homage to Lisa's heritage, with its title derived from a Thai greeting.

"Sawadika" received acclaim for its catchy hook, confident rapping, and celebration of Lisa's Thai identity. Commercially, it became the singer's highest-charting song on the US Billboard Hot 100, peaking at number 69, and entered the Billboard Global 200 at number 23. In Lisa's native counry Thailand, the song debuted at number three on the Official Thailand Chart. It also topped the charts in Singapore and reached the top ten in Malaysia and Taiwan.

An accompanying music video was directed by Bang Jae Yeob and released on Lloud's YouTube channel simultaneously with the single's release. Filmed in Bangkok, the video features Lisa performing at several locations across the city while incorporating Thai cultural imagery and fashion. It garnered 73.3 million views in its first 24 hours, becoming the biggest music video debut of 2026 and the second most-viewed debut by a soloist in history behind her own "Lalisa" (2021). Lisa performed "Sawadika" at the 2026 MTV Video Music Awards and her concert residency Viva La Lisa.

== Background and release ==
In August 2026, red billboards with the text "Hello สวัสดีค่ะ" (Note: สวัสดีค่ะ (sawatdi kha) is a Thai greeting meaning "hello".) appeared in major cities worldwide, including Bangkok, New York, Los Angeles and Mexico City. A website featuring "Hello" in multiple languages launched featuring a countdown to August 24. At the end of the countdown, Lisa announced "Sawadika" would be released on September 3 as the lead single of her first extended play, Press Play (2026). On August 28, Lisa shared a snippet of the track in a TikTok video featuring her dressed in gear in a boxing ring. She also released several concept photos for the single presenting traditional Thai symbols through a futuristic high fashion concept. In the first set of photos, she wore a contemporary take on Muay Thai attire, including boxing shorts with "Lisa" embroidered on the waistband. A second set of teasers showed her on a tuk tuk wearing a leather bodysuit and high-heeled lace-up boots, drawing from boxing footwear and Muay Thai styling.

== Composition and lyrics ==
Produced by Thom Bridges and Ojivolta, "Sawadika" marks a return to Lisa's rap roots. It captures her identity atop her distinctive rap prowess and signature hip-hop sound. The song is a homage to Lisa's home country of Thailand, with the title translating to "hello" in Thai. The chorus is built around the repeated "Hello Sawadika" hook and the refrain "La la Lisa la diva / Sawadika there she go." The song incorporates many references to Lisa's Thai identity, including the lyrics "Bang bang Bangkok bang" and "เก่งมาก" (geng mak), a Thai phrase meaning "so good." Other lyrics reference money and Bangkok street life, including baht accumulating in a bank and riding in a tuk tuk. The repeated questions "How many got discipline" and "How many that been where I been" reflect on Lisa's journey from Buriram, Thailand to a global star.

== Reception ==
Billboard named "Sawadika" the "undisputed" best track on Press Play, highlighting its confident rapping and vocals and hook "irresistible enough to charm the whole world". The publication praised the song for embracing Lisa's Thai identity and described it as a successful self-introduction that encapsulates the EP's cinematic concept. Thapanee Kiatphaibool, governor of the Tourism Authority of Thailand (TAT), thanked Lisa for her use of the Thai greeting in a comment under the singer's Instagram announcement, writing "The phrase you are promoting adds even greater resonance to the warmth and friendliness of the Thai people — 'sawasdee ka'."

== Music video ==
An accompanying music video was directed by Bang Jae Yeob, a Korean director known for his work on K-pop videos, and released on YouTube alongside the single. Filmed in Bangkok, Thailand, Lisa walks through several iconic locations in the city wearing outfits such as a red, cut-out leather bodysuit and boxing shorts with "Sawadika" in rhinestone letters across the waist. She also wears a black feathered catsuit and a spangly burgundy two-piece with matching headphones as she walks at night with her crew of dancers in black. For a rooftop dance, she wears a towering black feather headdress, before switching to a neon blue bikini with matching hair in an underground tunnel. Locations featured in the video include Hua Lamphong railway station on Rong Mueang Road, Soi Ngam Du Phli, Soi Charoen Khet 1, and DIB Bangkok.

According to YouTube, "Sawadika" garnered 73.3 million views in 24 hours, becoming the biggest music video debut of 2026 and the eighth-biggest of all time. The video broke the previous 2026 release record of BTS's "Swim", which received 33 million views in 24 hours. "Sawadika" is also the second most-viewed debut by a soloist in history in 24 hours, behind Lisa's own "Lalisa" (2021), which opened with 73.6 million views and remains the record-holder for the biggest opening day by a solo artist. Syrian artist Zeina accused the music video of plagiarizing her design for a coined headphone, but later revealed she had been officially credited.

== Live performances ==
Lisa made the live television debut of "Sawadika" at the 2026 MTV Video Music Awards on September 27, 2026. She included "Sawadika" as the closing song of her concert residency Viva La Lisa, which ran from November 12 to 29 in Las Vegas.

== Credits and personnel ==
Credits adapted from the liner notes of Press Play.

Recording

- Recorded at Westlake Recording Studios (West Hollywood, California)
- Mixed at Larrabee Studios (North Hollywood, California)
- Mastered at Sterling Sound (Edgewater, New Jersey)

Personnel

- Lisa – vocals, songwriter
- Thom Bridges – songwriter, producer
- Ojivolta – producer
  - Mark Williams – songwriter
  - Raul Cubina – songwriter
- Rachel West – songwriter
- Danny Chung – songwriter
- Kuk Harrell – recording engineer, vocal producer
- Fermin Suero Jr. – assistant engineer
- Manny Marroquin – mixing engineer
- Trey Station – assistant mixing engineer
- Ramiro Fernandez-Seoane – assistant mixing engineer
- Randy Merrill – mastering engineer

== Charts ==
=== Weekly charts ===
Weekly chart performance
Chart (2026)	Peak position
Argentina Anglo Airplay (Monitor Latino)	17
Australia (ARIA)	70
Belarus Airplay (TopHit)	112
Bolivia Anglo Airplay (Monitor Latino)	8
Canada Hot 100 (Billboard)	70
Central America Anglo Airplay (Monitor Latino)	11
China (TME Korean)	6
Costa Rica Anglo Airplay (Monitor Latino)	9
Ecuador Anglo Airplay (Monitor Latino)	9
El Salvador Anglo Airplay (Monitor Latino)	1
France (SNEP)	123
Global 200 (Billboard)	23
Greece International (IFPI)	20
Hong Kong (Billboard)	14
Israel (Mako Hitlist)	85
Malaysia (IFPI)	7
Malaysia International (RIM)	5
Netherlands (Global Top 40)	8
New Zealand Hot Singles (RMNZ)	5
Nicaragua Anglo Airplay (Monitor Latino)	3
Philippines Hot 100 (Billboard Philippines)	65
Portugal (AFP)	171
Romania Airplay (TopHit)	46
Singapore (RIAS)	1
Slovakia Singles Digital (ČNS IFPI)	73
South Korea Download (Circle)	70
Switzerland Streaming (Swiss Hitparade)	82
Taiwan (Billboard)	4
Thailand (IFPI)	3
UK Singles (Official Charts)	66
UK Hip Hop/R&B (Official Charts)	20
US Billboard Hot 100	69
US Hot Rap Songs (Billboard)	16
Vietnam Hot 100 (Billboard)	37

=== Monthly charts ===
Monthly chart performance
Chart (2026)	Peak position
Romania Airplay (TopHit)	93

== Release history ==
Release dates and formats
Region	Date	Format	Label	Ref.
Various	September 3, 2026	Digital download; streaming	Lloud; RCA	

== See also ==
- 24-Hour Vevo Record
- List of K-pop songs on the Billboard charts
- List of number-one songs of 2026 (Singapore)
