= Bad Angel =

2026 single by Anyma and Lisa

Single by Anyma and Lisa
- Released: 8 April 2026
- Genre: Techno-pop
- Length: 2:33
- Label: Interscope
- Songwriters: Matteo Milleri; Lisa; Burns; Johannes Klahr; Michael Tucker; Nija Charles; Rogét Chahayed
- Producers: Andreas Wilman; Anyma; Burns; BloodPop; Dimitri Vangelis; Klahr

Anyma singles chronology
"Beautiful" (2026)	"Bad Angel" (2026)

Lisa singles chronology
"Priceless" (2025)	"Bad Angel" (2026)	"Goals" (2026)

Music video
- "Bad Angel" on YouTube

"Bad Angel" is a song by Italian-American electronic music producer Anyma and Thai rapper and singer Lisa. It was released as a single on 8 April 2026 through Interscope Records. A melodic techno-pop track with lyrics about declaring independence, it was written by Lisa, Nija Charles, Rogét Chahayed, Anyma, Burns, BloodPop, and Klahr and produced by the latter four with Andreas Wilman and Dimitri Vangelis. Lisa performed "Bad Angel" at Coachella 2026 with Anyma as well as her concert residency Viva La Lisa.

== Background and release ==
On 11 February 2026, Anyma announced that he would embark on the ÆDEN World Tour, starting with live performances on 10 and 17 April at Coachella 2026 before heading to Asia, Australia, Europe and the Middle East. The producer released the single "Beautiful" with Japanese-Australian singer and rapper Joji on 3 April. On 7 April, Anyma and Lisa announced their new collaboration "Bad Angel" and its release date in a joint Instagram post. The post included a teaser video with visuals of Lisa waking up on a marble slab hooked up to wires, over a snippet of the song. The song was released one day later through Interscope Records on 8 April, ahead of Anyma's Coachella performance.

== Composition and lyrics ==
This record lives between worlds—human and digital, intimate and infinite. Lisa and I have talked about working together for a while now, and she was my muse for 'Bad Angel.' Her energy and performance blew me away and I can't imagine anyone else singing this song.

— Anyma on creating the song with Lisa.

"Bad Angel" is a melodic techno-pop track that moves between EDM and pop-laced R&B. It has been described as an atypical EDM track as it fuses melodic techno with sleek, futuristic pop elements, while incorporating Anyma's signature "enormous, echoing basslines and shimmering, crystalline synths." Lyrically, the song is a statement of independence in which Lisa uses her image to project strength, singing "I'm pretty, pretty bad for an angel / I do what I want when I say so" in the chorus.

In an interview with Clash, Anyma expressed that "Bad Angel" fits between "human and digital, intimate and infinite" worlds and described Lisa as his muse for the track. Lisa also expressed excitement about being on the song, adding "I've always loved EDM, so I've wanted to try something like this for a while. Anyma is so creative and has such a unique vision, so working with him was really fun. His shows are super immersive, and I think you can feel that energy in the track."

== Critical reception ==
Writing for Rolling Stone India, Debashree Dutta praised "Bad Angel" as a track that "demands to be heard on a massive sound system in a room, where it can vibrate in your chest." She also praised Lisa for exploring electronic music and described it as a "perfect fit for her evolving sound and solo career."

== Music video ==
The music video for "Bad Angel" was released on YouTube alongside the single and puts Lisa into Anyma's visual universe of transhumanist, cybernetic aesthetics. In the video, Lisa portrays Beatrix, an alter ego that is part human, angel, and android, wearing a white bodysuit and long, ashen hair. She exists in the world of ÆDEN, a liminal space between antiquity and a dystopian future in which "human-uploaded intelligences and artificial intelligences try to find a point of coexistence" in a "digital afterlife", loosely based on the structure of the Divine Comedy. The video starts as Beatrix wakes up on an altar and frees herself from wires plugged into her body. As she struts through ruins of ancient pillars, Anyma is depicted on his knees in a trance reassembling the ruins with his mind. A "glitch" in the digital universe, Beatrix walks through the real world's ruins to emerge more powerful.

== Live performances ==
Anyma was initially set to perform at the Coachella Valley Music and Arts Festival on 11 April 2026, but had to cancel his set due to strong winds affecting his stage setup. Instead, he performed with German DJ Marlon Hoffstadt at Coachella's Do LaB Stage on 12 April. The following week on 18 April, Anyma performed his headlining set at Coachella's Main Stage, including "Bad Angel". Lisa made a surprise appearance during the set to perform the song, wearing a translucent shimmering coverup over a metallic feathered bodysuit and a pair of silver boots. As Lisa performed onstage, imagery of her as the song's titular angel appeared on the screen behind her, while the livestream on YouTube also displayed a towering hologram of Lisa in the sky above her. Lisa included "Bad Angel" on the setlist of her concert residency Viva La Lisa, which ran from November 12 to 29, 2026 in Las Vegas.

== Credits and personnel ==
Credits adapted from Tidal.

- Anyma – songwriter, producer, mastering engineer, mix engineer
- Lisa – vocals, songwriter
- Burns – songwriter, producer
- Klahr – songwriter, producer
- BloodPop – songwriter, producer
- Nija Charles – songwriter
- Rogét Chahayed – songwriter, additional producer
- Andreas Wilman – producer
- Dimitri Vangelis – producer
- Tom Norris – mastering engineer, mix engineer
- Victor Velpillat – mixing, second engineer
- Fermin Suero, Jr. – vocal engineer, vocal producer
- Kuk Harrell – vocal engineer, vocal producer
- Andrew Boyd – vocal producer

== Charts ==
Weekly chart performance
Chart (2026)	Peak position
China (TME Korean)	32
Croatia International Airplay (Top lista)	84
Global Dance Radio (Billboard/WARM)	16
Honduras Anglo Airplay (Monitor Latino)	6
New Zealand Hot Singles (RMNZ)	21
Nicaragua Anglo Airplay (Monitor Latino)	3
Paraguay Anglo Airplay (Monitor Latino)	18
South Korea Download (Circle)	100
UK Singles Sales (OCC)	90
US Hot Dance/Electronic Songs (Billboard)	8

== Release history ==
Release dates and formats
Region	Date	Format	Label	Ref.
Various	8 April 2026	Digital download; streaming	Interscope	
