= Tarantino (song) =

2026 single by Lisa

Single by Lisa

from the EP Press Play
- Released: October 23, 2026
- Studio: Westlake Recording (West Hollywood)
- Length: 2:51
- Label: Lloud; RCA
- Songwriters: Lisa; Thom Bridges; Christian Astrop
- Producers: Thom Bridges; Beau Nox

Lisa singles chronology
"Sawadika" (2026)	"Tarantino" (2026)	"Leave with Me" (2026)

Music video
- "Tarantino" on YouTube

"Tarantino" is a song by Thai rapper and singer Lisa. It was released through Lloud and RCA Records on October 23, 2026, as the second single from her first extended play, Press Play (2026). It was written by Lisa with Thom Bridges and Beau Nox, who handled the production.

== Background and release ==
On August 24, Lisa announced her first extended play, Press Play, due for release on October 23, and its lead single "Sawadika". On The Tonight Show Starring Jimmy Fallon, she teased that the fourth track on the EP was the next single and begins with the letter T. On October 13, Lisa revealed the EP's tracklist, including "Tarantino" as the fourth track. The following day, she confirmed "Tarantino" would be released as the second single from Press Play simultaneously with the EP. The announcement was accompanied by the single's cover art, a circular photo of Lisa hiding her face behind a red envelope, as well as a snippet of the track. Lisa also released an extended preview of "Tarantino" in a PlayStation promotional spot two days before the song's release.

== Composition and lyrics ==
“Tarantino” was produced by Thom Bridges and Beau Nox, who co-wrote the song with Lisa. The song is a tribute to the American film director Quentin Tarantino, incorporating references to his visual style and films such as Kill Bill and Death Proof. The opening line, "Got my nails really long like the barrel of my gun," establishes the song’s cinematic theme by comparing Lisa's manicure to a prop from a Tarantino film. The song continues to evoke his films with references to a katana and "Hollywood in your hands" as well as sound effects of a swinging blade. The line “Mustard all on my sneakers” alludes to the Bride's yellow tracksuit in Kill Bill, while the reference to a "black suit" evokes well-dressed gangsters in Tarantino's films. Lisa also incorporates Thai elements into the song, such as the lyric "At the drive-thru Thai funk shaking out the trunk."

== Critical reception ==
Billboard ranked "Tarantino" as the fourth-best track on Press Play, praising the song for establishing the cinematic universe of the EP and its witty lyrics including the opening line. However, they felt that the song was surpassed in "sheer ear-grabbing power" by other tracks on the album, such as "V12".

== Music video ==
An accompanying video for "Tarantino" was directed by James Mackel and released alongside the single. Running for three and a half minutes, the clip depicts Lisa as a spy carrying out a mission in a hotel while preparing to catch a flight. She fights numerous villains throughout the hotel, using punches, kicks and other choreographed combat sequences. She performs a choreographed routine with the hotel’s chambermaids and bellboys before confronting members of the kitchen staff. At the end, Lisa slips a red letter under the door of to her "favorite director," with the message's contents undisclosed. The video also features a limited-edition Lisa PlayStation DualSense wireless controller, which she autographs for a fan.

== Live performances ==
Lisa performed "Tarantino" as the opening song of her concert residency Viva La Lisa, which ran from November 12 to 29 in Las Vegas.

== Credits and personnel ==
Credits adapted from the liner notes of Press Play.

Recording

- Recorded at Westlake Recording Studios (West Hollywood, California)
- Mixed at Larrabee Studios (North Hollywood, California)
- Mastered at Sterling Sound (Edgewater, New Jersey)

Personnel

- Lisa – vocals, songwriter
- Thom Bridges – songwriter, producer
- Beau Nox – songwriter, producer
- Erik Bandt – phin
- Bruno Valentjin Verhaar – guitar
- Kuk Harrell – recording engineer, vocal producer
- Fermin Suero Jr. – assistant engineer
- Manny Marroquin – mixing engineer
- Trey Station – assistant mixing engineer
- Ramiro Fernandez-Seoane – assistant mixing engineer
- Randy Merrill – mastering engineer

== Charts ==
Chart performance
Chart (2026)	Peak position
Australia (ARIA)	77
Bolivia Anglo Airplay (Monitor Latino)	7
China (TME Korean)	26
Estonia Airplay (TopHit)	153
Global 200 (Billboard)	97
Lithuania Airplay (TopHit)	41
Malaysia International (RIM)	18
New Zealand Hot Singles (RMNZ)	3
Nicaragua Anglo Airplay (Monitor Latino)	1
North Macedonia Airplay (Radiomonitor)	20
Philippines Hot 100 (Billboard Philippines)	66
Singapore (RIAS)	11
South Korea Download (Circle)	87
Thailand (IFPI)	5
UK Video Streaming (OCC)	6
US Bubbling Under Hot 100 (Billboard)	6

== Release history ==
Release dates and formats
Region	Date	Format	Label	Ref.
Various	October 23, 2026	Digital download; streaming	Lloud; RCA	
United States	October 27, 2026	Contemporary hit radio	Lloud; RCA	
