= Go Live (album) =

- Digital cover

Studio album by Stray Kids
- Released: June 17, 2020
- Studio: JYPE (Seoul); W Sound (Seoul); 821 Sound (Seoul)
- Genre: Hip-hop; EDM; K-pop
- Length: 43:49
- Language: Korean; English
- Label: JYP
- Producer: 3Racha; Armadillo; DallasK There so hot; Earattack; Eniac; Glory Face; Giriboy; Gwon Yeong-chan; HotSauce; Jake K; Peter Keusch; KZ; Larmook; Lee Hae-sol; MNDR; Mike Daley; Minit; MosPick; Mitchell Owens; Rangga; Andreas Ringblom; $un; Tae Bong-ee; Ung Kim; Versachoi

Stray Kids chronology
SKZ2020 (2020)	Go Live (2020)	All In (2020)

Singles from Go Live
- 1. "God's Menu" Released: June 17, 2020

Reissue album cover
- Digital cover

Singles from In Life
- 1. "Back Door" Released: September 14, 2020

Go Live (stylized in all caps; Korean: GO生; RR: Gosaeng) is the debut studio album by South Korean boy group Stray Kids. It was released by JYP Entertainment on June 17, 2020, and distributed through Dreamus. The lead single, "God's Menu", was released the same day. The reissue edition of the album, titled In Life (stylized in all caps; Korean: IN生; RR: Insaeng) was released on September 14, 2020, along with eight new tracks, including lead single "Back Door".

== Background and release ==
On May 27, 2020, the group announced the upcoming release of Go Live, their first full-length album for June 17, 2020, on their official Twitter account. Members Bang Chan, Changbin, and Han were heavily involved in the writing and production of the album as the collective "3Racha".

The title of the album, pronounced gosaeng (Korean: 고생; Hanja: 苦生) in Korean, translates to hardship, relating to one of the core themes of the album. The English title of the album references the group's desire to continue moving forward and living without inhibition. Members of the group stated that this project involved experimentation with a variety of genres ranging from trap, hip hop, acoustic rock, and EDM.

== Commercial performance ==
Go Live debuted atop the weekly Gaon Album Chart, and also at number five on the monthly chart with 243,462 copies sold, becoming Stray Kids' best-selling album at the time. As of August 2020, the album was certified Platinum by the Gaon Chart (sales of 250,000 copies), becoming the group's first album to do so.

The single "God's Menu" debuted at number 144 on the Gaon Weekly Download Chart, becoming the group's first single to appear on the chart, and also their first single to appear on the main digital chart of Gaon (combining all digital forms of music consumption).

== Accolades ==
The repackage In Life received a nomination for Album Bonsang at the 35th Golden Disc Awards, but did not win. Go Live was named the 10th best K-pop album of 2020 by Billboard, while the repackage was named one of the best K-pop albums of the year by several publications including Rolling Stone India (6th), Young Post (10th), South China Morning Post, and Time.

The single "Back Door" won two music program awards on the September 23 episode of Show Champion and September 24, 2020, episode of M Countdown. It appeared on several publications' year-end lists of the best K-pop songs of 2020 including Billboard (10th), Dazed (5th), Paper (2nd), Time (8th), while the track "Any" ranked 7th on MTV News list of the best K-pop B-sides of the year.

== Track listing ==
Go Live track listing
No.	Title	Lyrics	Music	Arrangement	Length
1.	"Go Live" (GO生)	Bang Chan (3Racha); Changbin (3Racha); Han (3Racha)	Bang Chan; Changbin; Han; Amanda MNDR Warner; Peter Wade Keusch	Amanda MNDR Warner; Peter Wade Keusch	1:51
2.	"God's Menu" (神메뉴)	Bang Chan; Changbin; Han	Bang Chan; Changbin; Han; Versachoi	Versachoi	2:48
3.	"Easy"	Bang Chan; Changbin; Han	Bang Chan; Changbin; Han; Michael Daley; Mike J; Henry Oyekanmi; Mitchell Owens	Michael Daley; Mitchell Owens	3:03
4.	"Pacemaker"	Bang Chan; Changbin; Han; Jinri (Full8loom)	Bang Chan; Changbin; Han; Jinri; Glory Face (Full8loom); Jake K (Artiffect	Glory Face; Jake K	3:11
5.	"Airplane" (비행기)	MosPick; $un; Young Chance; Bang Chan; Changbin	MosPick; $un; Young Chance; Bang Chan; Changbin	MosPick; $un	3:35
6.	"Another Day" (일상)	Han	Han; Bang Chan	Bang Chan	2:47
7.	"Phobia"	Bang Chan; Changbin; Han; Versachoi	Versachoi; Albin Nordqvist	Versachoi	3:33
8.	"Blueprint" (청사진)	Lee Seu-ran; Earattack; Bang Chan; Changbin; Han	Earattack; Eniac	Earattack; Eniac	4:11
9.	"Ta" (타)	Bang Chan; Changbin; Han	Bang Chan; Changbin; Han; Lee Hae-sol	Lee Hae-sol	3:29
10.	"Haven"	Bang Chan	Bang Chan; Versachoi	Bang Chan; Versachoi	3:20
11.	"Top" (Tower of God OP)	Armadillo; Bang Chan; Changbin; Han	Armadillo; Bang Chan; Changbin; Han; Rangga; Gwon Yeong-chan	Armadillo; Bang Chan; Rangga; Gwon Yeong-chan	3:06
12.	"Slump" (Tower of God ED)	Han	Han; Bang Chan	Bang Chan	2:12
13.	"Mixtape: Gone Days"	Bang Chan	Bang Chan; Trippy	Giriboy; Minit	3:15
14.	"Mixtape: On Track" (바보라도 알아)	Changbin; KZ; B.O.	Changbin; KZ; Tae Bong-ee; B.O.	KZ; Tae Bong-ee	3:28
Total length:					43:49

In Life bonus tracks
No.	Title	Lyrics	Music	Arrangement	Length
1.	"The Tortoise and the Hare" (토끼와 거북이)	Bang Chan; Changbin; Han	Bang Chan; Changbin; Han; Amanda MNDR Warner; Peter Wade Keusch	Amanda MNDR Warner; Peter Wade Keusch	3:44
2.	"Back Door"	Bang Chan; Changbin; Han	Bang Chan; Changbin; Han; HotSauce	HotSauce; Bang Chan	3:09
3.	"B Me"	Bang Chan; Changbin; Han; Earattack	Bang Chan; Changbin; Han; Earattack	Earattack; Larmook	3:25
4.	"Any" (아니)	Bang Chan; Changbin; Han	Bang Chan; Changbin; Han; Matluck; Tele	Tele; Bang Chan	2:49
5.	"Ex" (미친 놈)	Bang Chan; Changbin	Bang Chan; Changbin; HotSauce	HotSauce	3:37
6.	"We Go" (Bang Chan, Changbin, Han)	Bang Chan; Changbin; Han	Bang Chan; Nick Furlong; Dallas Koehlke	DallasK; Bang Chan	2:38
7.	"Wow" (Lee Know, Hyunjin, Felix)	Lee Know; Hyunjin; Felix; Kass	Christopher Worthly; Massimo Del Gaudio; Andreas Ringblom	Andreas Ringblom	3:14
8.	"My Universe" (Seungmin, I.N featuring Changbin)	Iggy; Ung Kim; Changbin; Seungmin; I.N	Iggy; Ung Kim	Ung Kim	3:23
Total length:					55:56

Notes

- "Go Live" and "Ta" are stylized in all caps.
- Pronunciation and translation of Korean track titles:
  - "GO生" pronounces Gosaeng.
  - "神메뉴" pronounces Shinme-nyu.
  - "비행기" pronounces Bihaenggi.
  - "일상" (Ilsang) means "daily life".
  - "청사진" pronounces Cheongsajin.
  - "바보라도 알아" (Baborado ara) means "even a fool knows".
  - "토끼와 거북이" pronounces Tokkiwa Geobugi.
  - "아니" (Ani) means "no".
  - "미친놈" (Michin nom) means "crazy person" (insult word in Korean).
- After In Life's bonus tracks, Go Live's songs directly start with "God's Menu" and end on "Haven", omitting tracks 1 and 11–14.

== Credits and personnel ==
Credits adapted from Melon.

=== Go Live ===
- Bang Chan (3Racha) – vocalist, background vocalist (track 3, 4, 7, 11, 12, 13), lyricist (all tracks except 6, 12, 14), composer (all tracks except 7, 8, 14), arranger (track 6, 10, 11, 12), computer programmer (track 6, 11, 12), guitarist (track 10)
- Changbin (3Racha) – vocalist, background vocalist (track 11), chorus (track 14), lyricist (all tracks except 6, 10, 12, 13), composer (all tracks except 6, 7, 8, 10, 12, 13)
- Han (3Racha) – vocalist, background vocalist (track 6, 11, 12), lyricist (all tracks except 5, 10, 13, 14), composer (all tracks except 5, 7, 8, 10, 13, 14)
- Lee Know – vocalist
- Hyunjin – vocalist
- Felix – vocalist
- Seungmin – vocalist, background vocalist (track 7), chorus (track 14)
- I.N – vocalist
- Amanda MNDR Warner – composer (track 1), arranger (track 1), computer programmer (track 1)
- Peter Wade Keusch – composer (track 1), arranger (track 1), computer programmer (track 1)
- Versachoi – lyricist (track 7), composer (track 2, 7, 10), arranger (track 2, 7, 10), computer programmer (track 2, 7, 10), drummer (track 2, 7, 10), keyboardist (track 7, 10), guitarist (track 7), bassist (track 7, 10)
- Mike Daley – composer (track 3), arranger (track 3), instrumentalist (track 3), computer programmer (track 3)
- Mike J – composer (track 3), background vocalist (track 3)
- Henry Oyekanmi – composer (track 3)
- Mitchell Owens – composer (track 3), arranger (track 3), instrumentalist (track 3), computer programmer (track 3)
- Jinri (Full8loom) – lyricist (track 4), composer (track 4), background vocalist (track 4),
- Glory Face (Full8loom) – composer (track 4), arranger (track 4)
- Jake K (ARTiffect) – composer (track 4), arranger (track 4), instrumentalist (track 4), computer programmer (track 4)
- MosPick – lyricist (track 5), composer (track 5), arranger (track 5)
- $un – lyricist (track 5), composer (track 5), arranger (track 5)
- Young Chance – lyricist (track 5), composer (track 5), chorus (track 5)
- Albin Nordqvist – composer (track 7)
- Lee Seu-ran – lyricist (track 8)
- earattack – lyricist (track 8), composer (track 8), arranger (track 8), computer programmer (track 8), background vocalist (track 8)
- Eniac – composer (track 8), arranger (track 8), computer programmer (track 8)
- Lee Hae-sol – composer (track 9), arranger (track 9), synthesist (track 9), keyboardist (track 9), drum programmer (track 9), vocal editor (track 9)
- Armadillo – lyricist (track 11), composer (track 11), arranger (track 11), computer programmer (track 11)
- Rangga – composer (track 11), arranger (track 11), computer programmer (track 11)
- Gwon Yeong-chan – composer (track 11), arranger (track 11)
- Trippy – composer (track 13)
- Giriboy – arranger (track 13), instrumentalist (track 13), computer programmer (track 13)
- Minit – arranger (track 13), instrumentalist (track 13), computer programmer (track 13)
- KZ – lyricist (track 14), composer (track 14), arranger (track 14), MIDI programmer (track 14), pianist (track 14), electronic pianist (track 14), drummer (track 14), bassist (track 14), chorus (track 14)
- B.O. – lyricist (track 14), composer (track 14), chorus (track 14)
- Tae Bongee – composer (track 14), arranger (track 14), MIDI programmer (track 14), guitarist (track 14), electronic pianist (track 14), drummer (track 14)
- PLZY – background vocalist (track 11)
- Kang Dong-ha – piano (track 5)
- Jukjae – guitarist (track 6), background vocal producer (track 6)
- Kim Jong-sung – guitarist (track 8)
- Kim Jwa-young – bassist (track 8)
- Jang Jun-ho – instrumentalist (track 4), computer programmer (track 4)
- Uhm Se-hee – recorder (track 1, 3, 4, 6, 10, 14)
- Lee Sang-yeob – recorder (track 2)
- Choi Hye-jin – recorder (track 5, 7, 8, 9)
- EJO IM (Imagine Muzik) – recorder (track 11, 12)
- Seoko IM – recorder (track 12), digital editor (track 12)
- Kim Min-hee – recorder (track 13)
- Lee Kyung-won – vocalist editor (track 2,7)
- Jang Han-soo – vocalist editor (track 6, 9), mixer (track 1)
- YUE – vocalist editor (track 3)
- Who's H – vocalist editor (track 14)
- Jung Yu-ra – digital editor (track 8, 11)
- Manny Marroquin – mixer (track 2)
- Im Hong-jin – mixer (track 3, 5, 9, 10)
- Lee Tae-seob – mixer (track 4, 6, 8, 11)
- Jay-p Gu – mixer (track 7)
- Shin Bong-won – mixer (track 12)
- Bae Jae-han – mixer (track 13), masterer (track 13)
- Phil Tan – mixer (track 14)
- Chris Galland – mix engineer (track 2)
- Robin Florent – mix engineer assistant (track 2)
- Bill Zimmerman – additional engineer (track 14)
- Park Jeong-eon – masterer (all tracks expect 2, 11, 12, 13, 14)
- Chris Gehringer – masterer (track 2, 14)
- Will Quinnell – masterer assistant (track 2, 14)
- Kwon Nam-woo – masterer (track 11, 12)

=== In Life ===
Note: Only new tracks (1–8)

- Bang Chan (3Racha) – vocalist (all track expect 7, 8), lyricist (all track expect 7, 8), composer (all track expect 7, 8), arranger (track 2, 4, 6), computer programmer (track 2, 4), background vocalist (track 2, 4, 5), instrumentalist (track 4)
- Changbin (3Racha) – vocalist (all track expect 7), lyricist (all track expect 7), composer (all track expect 7, 8), background vocalist (track 2, 5)
- Han (3Racha) – vocalist (all track expect 7, 8), lyricist (all track expect 5, 7, 8), composer (all track expect 5, 7, 8), background vocalist (track 2)
- Lee Know – vocalist (all track expect 6, 8), lyricist (track 7)
- Hyunjin – vocalist (all track expect 6, 8), lyricist (track 7)
- Felix – vocalist (all track expect 6, 8), lyricist (track 7)
- Seungmin – vocalist (all track expect 6, 7), lyricist (track 8), background vocalist (track 2, 5, 8)
- I.N – vocalist (all track expect 6, 7), lyricist (track 8)
- Amanda MNDR Warner – composer (track 1), arranger (track 1), computer programmer (track 1)
- Peter Wade Keusch – composer (track 1), arranger (track 1), computer programmer (track 1)
- HotSauce – composer (track 2, 5), arranger (track 2, 5), computer programmer (track 2, 5), guitarist (track 2, 5), keyboardist (track 2, 5), drum programmer (track 2, 5)
- earattack – lyricist (track 3), composer (track 3), arranger (track 3), computer programmer (track 3), background vocalist (track 3)
- Matluck – composer (track 4)
- Tele – composer (track 4), arranger (track 4), computer programmer (track 4), instrumentalist (track 4)
- Nick Furlong – composer (track 6), instrumentalist (track 6)
- DallasK – composer (track 6), arranger (track 6), instrumentalist (track 6)
- Kass – lyricist (track 7)
- Christopher Wortley – composer (track 7)
- Massimo Del Gaudio – composer (track 7)
- Andreas Ringblom – composer (track 7), arranger (track 7), computer programmer (track 7), vocal samples (track 7)
- Iggy – lyricist (track 8), composer (track 8)
- Ung Kim – lyricist (track 8), composer (track 8), arranger (track 8), bassist (track 8), synthesist (track 8), pianist (track 8),
- Kim Ji-sang – guitarist (track 8)
- Yoon Do-hyun – background vocalist (track 8)
- Lee Kyung-won – vocalist editor (track 2, 4, 5)
- Uhm Se-hee – recorder (track 1, 2, 4)
- Park Eun-jung – recorder (track 3), mixer (track 4)
- Choi Hye-jin – recorder (track 5)
- Jeremy Simoneaux – recorder (track 6)
- Jung Eun-kyung – recorder (track 6, 8)
- Kim Eun-cheol – recorder (track 7)
- Jung Yu-ra – digital editor (track 3)
- Jang Han-soo – mixer (track 1)
- Manny Marroquin – mixer (track 2)
- Lee Tae-seob – mixer (track 3, 6, 8)
- Ko Hyun-jung – mixer (track 5)
- Im Hong-jin – mixer (track 7)
- Chris Galland – mix engineer (track 2)
- Robin Florent – mix engineer assistant (track 2)
- Park Jeong-eon – masterer (all tracks expect 2)
- Chris Gehringer – masterer (track 2)

== Charts ==
=== Weekly charts ===
Weekly chart performance of Go Live
Chart (2020–2022)	Peak position
Austrian Albums (Ö3 Austria)	27
Belgian Albums (Ultratop Flanders)	42
Belgian Albums (Ultratop Wallonia)	69
Croatian International Albums (HDU)	29
Danish Albums (Hitlisten)	38
Finnish Albums (Suomen virallinen lista)	38
French Albums (SNEP)	54
German Albums (Offizielle Top 100)	13
Hungarian Albums (MAHASZ)	10
Japanese Albums (Oricon)	6
Japanese Download Albums (Billboard)	40
Polish Albums (ZPAV)	5
South Korean Albums (Gaon)	1
Spanish Albums (Promusicae)	43
Swiss Albums (Schweizer Hitparade)	43
UK Album Downloads (OCC)	69
US Heatseekers Albums (Billboard)	3
US Independent Albums (Billboard)	29
US Top Album Sales (Billboard)	26
US Top Current Album Sales (Billboard)	22
US World Albums (Billboard)	4

Weekly chart performance of In Life
Chart (2020–2022)	Peak position
Belgian Albums (Ultratop Flanders)	36
Belgian Albums (Ultratop Wallonia)	53
Croatian International Albums (HDU)	30
Czech Albums (ČNS IFPI)	98
Danish Albums (Hitlisten)	27
Dutch Albums (Album Top 100)	78
Finnish Albums (Suomen virallinen lista)	39
Hungarian Albums (MAHASZ)	5
Japanese Hot Albums (Billboard Japan)	45
Polish Albums (ZPAV)	8
South Korean Albums (Gaon)	1
UK Album Downloads (OCC)	53
UK Independent Album Breakers (OCC)	20
US Heatseekers Albums (Billboard)	4
US Independent Albums (Billboard)	50
US Top Current Album Sales (Billboard)	100
US World Albums (Billboard)	4

=== Year-end charts ===
Year-end chart performance of Go Live
Chart (2020)	Position
Japanese Albums (Oricon)	85
South Korean Albums (Gaon)	27
Chart (2021)	Position
South Korean Albums (Gaon)	95

Year-end chart performance of In Life
Chart (2020)	Position
Hungarian Albums (MAHASZ)	65
South Korean Albums (Gaon)	22
Chart (2021)	Position
Hungarian Albums (MAHASZ)	86
South Korean Albums (Gaon)	84
Chart (2022)	Position
Hungarian Albums (MAHASZ)	85

=== Single charts ===
Chart performance of "Back Door"
Chart (2020)	Peak position
Global 200 (Billboard)	169
Hungary (Single Top 40)	36
New Zealand Hot Singles (RMNZ)	23
Singapore (RIAS)	22
South Korea Download (Gaon)	11
South Korea (K-Pop 100)	79
US World Digital Song Sales (Billboard)	2

== Certifications ==
Certifications for Go Live
Region	Certification	Certified units/sales
South Korea (KMCA)	3× Platinum	750,000^{^}
^{^} Shipments figures based on certification alone.

Certifications for In Life
Region	Certification	Certified units/sales
South Korea (KMCA)	3× Platinum	750,000^{^}
^{^} Shipments figures based on certification alone.

== Release history ==
Release history and formats for Go Live and In Life
Country	Date	Format	Work	Label
Various	June 17, 2020	Digital download; streaming	Go Live	JYP; Dreamus
South Korea	June 17, 2020	CD	Go Live	JYP; Dreamus
Various	September 14, 2020	Digital download; streaming	In Life	JYP; Dreamus
South Korea	September 14, 2020	CD	In Life	JYP; Dreamus
