= God's Menu =

Single by Stray Kids

from the album Go Live
- Language: Korean
- Released: June 17, 2020
- Studio: JYPE (Seoul)
- Genre: Trap
- Length: 2:48
- Label: JYP
- Composers: Bang Chan; Changbin; Han; Versachoi
- Lyricists: Bang Chan; Changbin; Han

Stray Kids singles chronology
"Top" (2020)	"God's Menu" (2020)	"Back Door" (2020)

Music video
- "God's Menu" on YouTube

"God's Menu" (Korean: 神메뉴; RR: Sinmenyu) (Note: Sometimes written fully in Hangul as "신메뉴") is a song recorded by South Korean boy band Stray Kids. It is the second and title track from their first Korean-language studio album Go Live. It was released as the album's lead single on June 17, 2020, through JYP Entertainment, and distributed by Dreamus. "God's Menu" is regarded as the group's most identifiable and signature track.

== Background ==
Stray Kids' first Korean-language studio album Go Live was first announced via a trailer on May 27, 2020, and set to be released on June 17. The album's track listing was posted a day later. Out of 12 songs, "God's Menu" appears as the second track and is marked as the lead single. Members Bang Chan, Changbin, and Han were heavily involved in the writing and production of the album under the helm 3Racha; "God's Menu" was released on the same day as the album release.

== Music and lyrics ==
"God's Menu" (2020)
"God's Menu" described as spicy music and the pioneer of mala taste genre.

"God's Menu" described as the pioneer of "mala taste music" (Korean: 마라맛 음악; RR: Maramat eumak), adopted from the hot and spicy mala seasoning.

== Music video ==
An accompanying music video for "God's Menu" was uploaded on June 17, 2020, in conjunction with the single release. It was directed by Bang Jae-yeob and preceded by a teaser 3 days before its release. The video also features Mako, Rio, Maya, Ayaka, Rima and Miihi, members of the then-predebut Japanese girl group NiziU under JYP Entertainment. As of February 9, 2025, the music video has surpassed 500 million views, the most viewed Stray Kids' music video on YouTube.

== Live performances ==
Starting on June 17, the release date, Stray Kids performed "God's Menu" at several music programs in South Korea, such as Music Bank, Show! Music Core, Inkigayo, and M Countdown.

== Accolades ==
"Gods Menu" appeared on year-end lists of the best K-pop songs of 2020 of several publications including BuzzFeed (15th), CNN Philippines Life (unranked), Cosmopolitan Philippines (2nd), and Rolling Stone India (12th). In 2023, Rolling Stone in included it in their list of the 100 Greatest Songs in the History of Korean Pop Music at number 84, citing it as the "perfected vision of [Stray Kids'] noisy, explosive trap-pop" as they take the "bad-boy concept and set it aflame."

== Credits and personnel ==
Credits adapted from Melon.

Personnel

- Stray Kids – vocals
  - Bang Chan (3Racha) – lyrics, composition
  - Changbin (3Racha) – lyrics, composition
  - Han (3Racha) – lyrics, composition
- Versachoi – composition, arrangement, drum, computer programming
- Lee Sang-yeob – recording
- Lee Kyung-won – vocal editing
- Manny Marroquin – mixing
- Chris Galland – mix engineer
- Robin Florent – mix engineer assistant
- Chris Gehringer – mastering
- Will Quinnell – mastering assistant

== Charts ==
Chart performance of "God's Menu"
Chart (2020)	Peak position
New Zealand Hot Singles (RMNZ)	24
South Korea Download (Gaon)	144
US World Digital Song Sales (Billboard)	4

== Certifications ==
Certifications and sales for "God's Menu"
Region	Certification	Certified units/sales
United Kingdom (BPI)	Silver	200,000^{‡}
United States (RIAA)	Platinum	1,000,000^{‡}
Streaming
Japan (RIAJ)	Gold	50,000,000^{†}
^{‡} Sales+streaming figures based on certification alone.^{†} Streaming-only figures based on certification alone.
