= Press Play (Lisa EP) =

- Digital and standard cover

EP by Lisa
- Released: October 23, 2026
- Studio: Westlake Recording (West Hollywood)
- Length: 16:10
- Languages: English; Thai
- Labels: Lloud; RCA
- Producers: Beau Nox; Thom Bridges; Dem Jointz; Dan Farber; Johnny Goldstein; Ojivolta

Lisa chronology
Alter Ego (2025)	Press Play (2026)

Singles from Press Play
- 1. "Sawadika" Released: September 3, 2026; 2. "Tarantino" Released: October 23, 2026

Press Play is the first extended play by the Thai rapper and singer Lisa. It was released on October 23, 2026, by Lloud and RCA Records.

== Background and release ==
In August 2026, red billboards with the text "Hello สวัสดีค่ะ" (Note: สวัสดีค่ะ (sawatdi kha) is a Thai greeting meaning "hello".) appeared in major cities worldwide, including Bangkok, New York, Los Angeles and Mexico City. A website featuring "Hello" in multiple languages launched featuring a countdown to August 24. At the end of the countdown, Lisa announced her debut extended play Press Play and its release date of October 23, as well as the lead single "Sawadika". She also revealed the EP's cover art, in which the rapper looks at the camera in a chic dress with her long hair fluttering in the air. On October 14, Lisa announced "Tarantino" as the second single from Press Play, to be released alongside the EP.

== Composition and lyrics ==
Consisting of six tracks, Press Play was described as Lisa "at her most personal." The EP reflects on Lisa's personal journey and rise to global fame, while honoring her Thai roots and where her career began. On The Tonight Show Starring Jimmy Fallon, Lisa shared that the EP incorporates many Thai elements and that each song features a unique character, stating "It's like a movie. So you just press play."

== Track listing ==
Press Play track listing
No.	Title	Writer(s)	Producer(s)	Length
1.	"Sawadika"	Lisa; Thom Bridges; Raul Cubina; Mark Williams; Danny Chung; Rachel West	Bridges; Ojivolta; Kuk Harrell^{[v]}	3:08
2.	"V12"	Lisa; 8AE; Dwayne Abernathy Jr.; Jonathan Bach; Chris Collins; Claudia Valentina	Dem Jointz; Harrell^{[v]}	2:50
3.	"Cobra"	Lisa; 8AE; Zikai; Johnny Goldstein; Melissa Elliott; Timothy Mosley; Paul Huston; David Jolicoeur; Vincent Mason; Kelvin Mercer; Thomas Allen; Harold Brown; Morris Dickerson; Gerald Goldstein; Leroy Jordan; Lee Levitin; Charles Miller; Howard Scott	J. Goldstein; Harrell^{[v]}	2:19
4.	"Tarantino"	Lisa; Christian Astrop; Bridges	Beau Nox; Bridges; Harrell^{[v]}	2:51
5.	"Cut U Off"	Lisa; 8AE; Zikai; Helena Gao; J. Goldstein; Bernard Herrmann	J. Goldstein; Harrell^{[v]}	2:28
6.	"Sweat"	Lisa; 8AE; Dan Farber; Gao	Farber; Harrell^{[v]}	2:34
Total length:				16:10

=== Notes ===
- ^{^[v]} indicates a vocal producer.
- "Sawadika" is stylized as "SaWaDiKa".
- "Cobra" contains an interpolation of "Bomb Intro/Pass That Dutch" (2003), written by Melissa Elliott, Timothy Mosley, Paul Huston, David Jolicoeur, Vincent Mason, Kelvin Mercer, Thomas Allen, Harold Brown, Morris Dickerson, Gerald Goldstein, Leroy Jordan, Lee Levitin, Charles Miller and Howard Scott, and performed by Missy Elliott.

== Personnel ==
Credits are adapted from Tidal.

- Lisa – vocals
- Kuk Harrell – engineering
- Fermin Suero Jr. – engineering assistance
- Manny Marroquin – mixing
- Ramiro Fernandez-Seoane – mixing assistance
- Trey Station – mixing assistance
- Randy Merrill – mastering
- Bruno Valentijn Verhaar – guitar (track 4)
- Erik Bandt – phin (track 4)
- Helena Gao – background vocals (track 6)

== Charts ==
Chart performance
Chart (2026)	Peak position
Australian Albums (ARIA)	34
Austrian Albums (Ö3 Austria)	21
Belgian Albums (Ultratop Flanders)	31
Belgian Albums (Ultratop Wallonia)	10
Dutch Albums (Album Top 100)	64
French Albums (SNEP)	20
German Albums (Offizielle Top 100)	37
German Pop Albums (Offizielle Top 100)	20
Greek Albums (IFPI)	85
Hungarian Physical Albums (MAHASZ)	28
Italian Albums (FIMI)	56
Japanese Albums (Oricon)	42
Japanese Combined Albums (Oricon)	88
Japanese Download Albums (Billboard Japan)	25
Japanese Top Albums Sales (Billboard Japan)	36
New Zealand Albums (RMNZ)	36
Polish Albums (ZPAV)	12
Scottish Albums (Official Charts)	17
South Korean Retail Albums (Circle)	7
Spanish Albums (Promusicae)	28
Swedish Physical Albums (Sverigetopplistan)	20
Swiss Albums (Schweizer Hitparade)	16
UK Albums Sales (Official Charts)	13
US Billboard 200	35

== Release history ==
Release history
Region	Date	Formats	Label	Ref.
Various	October 23, 2026	CD; vinyl LP; digital download; streaming	Lloud; RCA	
