= Bava =

Bava is a surname that can either be of Italian, Gujarati, Konkani, or Punjabi origin. The Italian surname originates from a nickname meaning 'dribble slime', while the Punjabi surname is a variant of Bawa, a Sikh name borne by the male descendants of the first three Sikh gurus.

Notable people with the surname include:

- Bava Chelladurai (born 1962), Indian writer, storyteller and actor
- E. K. Imbichi Bava (1917–1995), Indian politician
- Eugenio Bava (1886–1966), Italian film cinematographer
- Eusebio Bava (1790–1854), Italian general
- Jorge Bava (born 1981), Uruguayan football manager and player
- Lamberto Bava (born 1944), Italian film director
- Mario Bava (1914–1980), Italian filmmaker
- Mohiuddin Bava, Indian politician
- T. O. Bava (1919–2007), Indian politician
- Vijaygiri Bava (born 1987), Indian filmmaker and screenwriter
- Zeinal Bava, Mozambican-born Indian-Portuguese businessman

== Similar surnames ==
- Giuseppe Riccobaldi del Bava (1887–1976), Italian painter
- Judah ben Bava, Jewish rabbi

== See also ==
- Bava Batra, the third of the three Talmudic tractates
- Bava Kamma, the second of the three Talmudic tractates
- Bava Metzia, the first of the three Talmudic tractates
- Bava Park, a sports center in Port Moresby, Papua New Guinea
- Fiorenzo Bava Beccaris (1831–1924), Italian general
- T. K. M. Bava Musliyar (1930–2013), Indian Muslim scholar
