= Lisa (rapper) =

Thai rapper and singer (born 1997)

- ลิซ่า
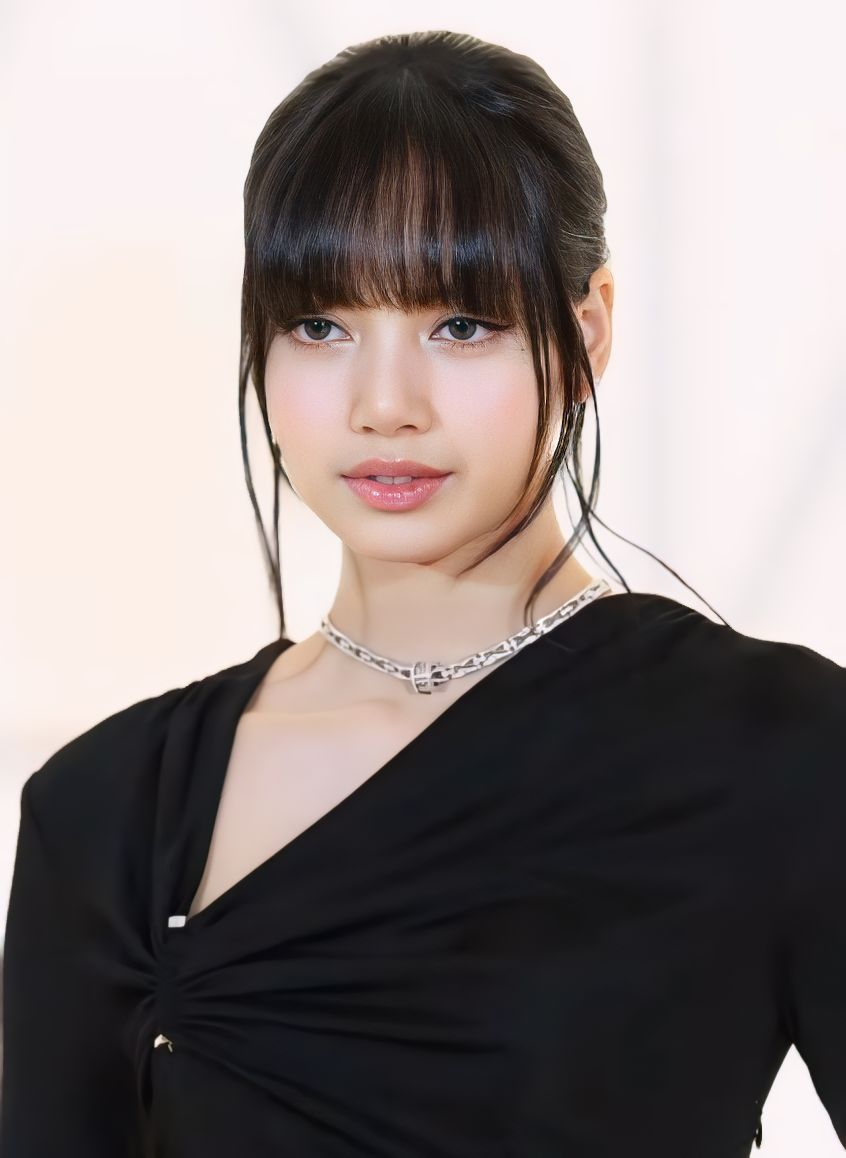
- Lisa in 2024
- Born: Pranpriya Manobal; 27 March 1997 (age 29); Satuek district, Buriram province, Thailand
- Occupations: Rapper; singer; dancer; actress
- Organization: Lloud
- Works: Discography (Note: For her work with Blackpink, see Blackpink discography, songs recorded, and videography.)
- Awards: Full list (Note: For her awards received as a member of Blackpink, see List of awards and nominations received by Blackpink.)
- Honours: Okgwan Order of Cultural Merit (2026)
- Musical career
- Origin: South Korea
- Genres: K-pop; dance-pop; hip-hop; hyperpop
- Instrument: Vocals
- Years active: 2016–present
- Labels: YG; Interscope; Lloud; RCA
- Member of: Blackpink
- Website: lalisaofficial.com

Lalisa Manobal (Note: Lisa spells her surname Manobal in the Latin alphabet. The name would be rendered as Manoban under the Royal Thai General System of Transcription.) (Thai: ลลิษา มโนบาล; (Note: Thai pronunciation: [lá.lí.sǎː má.nōː.bāːn]) born Pranpriya Manobal, (Note: Thai: ปราณปรียา มโนบาล. RTGS: Pranpriya Manoban. Thai pronunciation: [prāːn.prīː.jāː má.nōː.bāːn].) March 27, 1997), known mononymously as Lisa (Thai: ลิซ่า; Korean: 리사), is a Thai rapper, singer, dancer, and actress. She rose to prominence as a member of the South Korean girl group Blackpink, which debuted under YG Entertainment in August 2016 and became one of the best-selling girl groups of all time.

In September 2021, Lisa released her debut single album Lalisa, which made her the first female artist to sell over 500,000 copies of an album in its first week in South Korea and spawned the Billboard Global 200 top-ten singles "Lalisa" and "Money". The music video for "Lalisa" is the most-viewed in the first 24 hours on YouTube by a solo artist, while "Money" became the first song by a K-pop solo artist to reach one billion streams on Spotify. In 2024, Lisa established her own management company named Lloud and signed with RCA Records. She reached number one on the Billboard Global Excl. US with "Rockstar", the lead single from her debut studio album Alter Ego (2025). The album debuted in the top ten of the US Billboard 200 and included the Official Thailand Chart number-one songs "Born Again" and "Dream".

Outside of music, Lisa made her acting debut in 2025 in the third season of the HBO television series The White Lotus. Her accolades include nine Guinness World Records, a Mnet Asian Music Award, three MTV Europe Music Awards, and four MTV Video Music Awards; she became the first K-pop soloist to win at the latter two award ceremonies. Lisa was honored as a cultural ambassador leader by Thailand's Ministry of Culture and was acknowledged by Prime Minister Prayut Chan-o-cha for her contributions to spreading Thai culture globally. She was inducted into the Asian Hall of Fame in 2023 and has appeared on the Forbes Korea Power Celebrity 40 (2025–2026). In addition to being the most-followed K-pop artist on Instagram, Lisa has been recognized for her influence in fashion as a global ambassador for Celine, Bulgari, and Louis Vuitton.

== Life and career ==
=== 1997–2010: Early life and education ===
Lisa was born Pranpriya Manobal on 27 March 1997, in Satuek district, Buriram province, Thailand, and later legally changed her name to Lalisa, meaning "the one being praised", at the advice of a fortune teller for prosperity. An only child, she was raised by her Thai Buddhist mother, Chitthip Brüschweiler, and her Swiss stepfather, chef Marco Brüschweiler. Lisa completed secondary education at Praphamontree School I and II. She is multilingual; along with her native Thai, she speaks fluent Korean and English, as well as basic Japanese and Chinese.

After enrolling in dance classes at the age of four, she began competing regularly in contests, including in To Be Number One, and joined the eleven-member dance crew We Zaa Cool alongside BamBam of Got7. In September 2009, the crew entered the LG Entertainment Million Dream Sanan World competition broadcast on Channel 9 and won the Special Team Award. Lisa also participated as a school representative in the singing contest Top 3 Good Morals of Thailand, hosted by the Moral Promotion Center in early 2009, finishing as the runner-up.

=== 2012–2015: Pre-debut activities ===
In 2010, at age 13, Lisa auditioned to join the South Korean record label YG Entertainment in Thailand. She grew interested in K-pop as a child thanks to artists such as BigBang and 2NE1 and aspired to follow a similar path. Among 4,000 applicants, she was the only one to qualify, which prompted then CEO Yang Hyun-suk to offer Lisa a chance to become a YG Entertainment trainee. At her audition, Lisa also impressed one of the judges, Danny Im of 1TYM, who later praised her on-stage confidence and off-stage attitude.

In 2011, Lisa moved to South Korea to begin her formal training. She officially joined the label as its first non-ethnic Korean trainee on April 11. In November 2013, she appeared in the music video for labelmate Taeyang's single "Ringa Linga" as a backup dancer alongside members of labelmates and boy bands iKon and Winner. In March 2015, Lisa undertook her first modelling job for the streetwear brand Nona9on, followed by South Korean cosmetics brand Moonshot in 2016.

=== 2016–2023: Debut with Blackpink and Lalisa ===
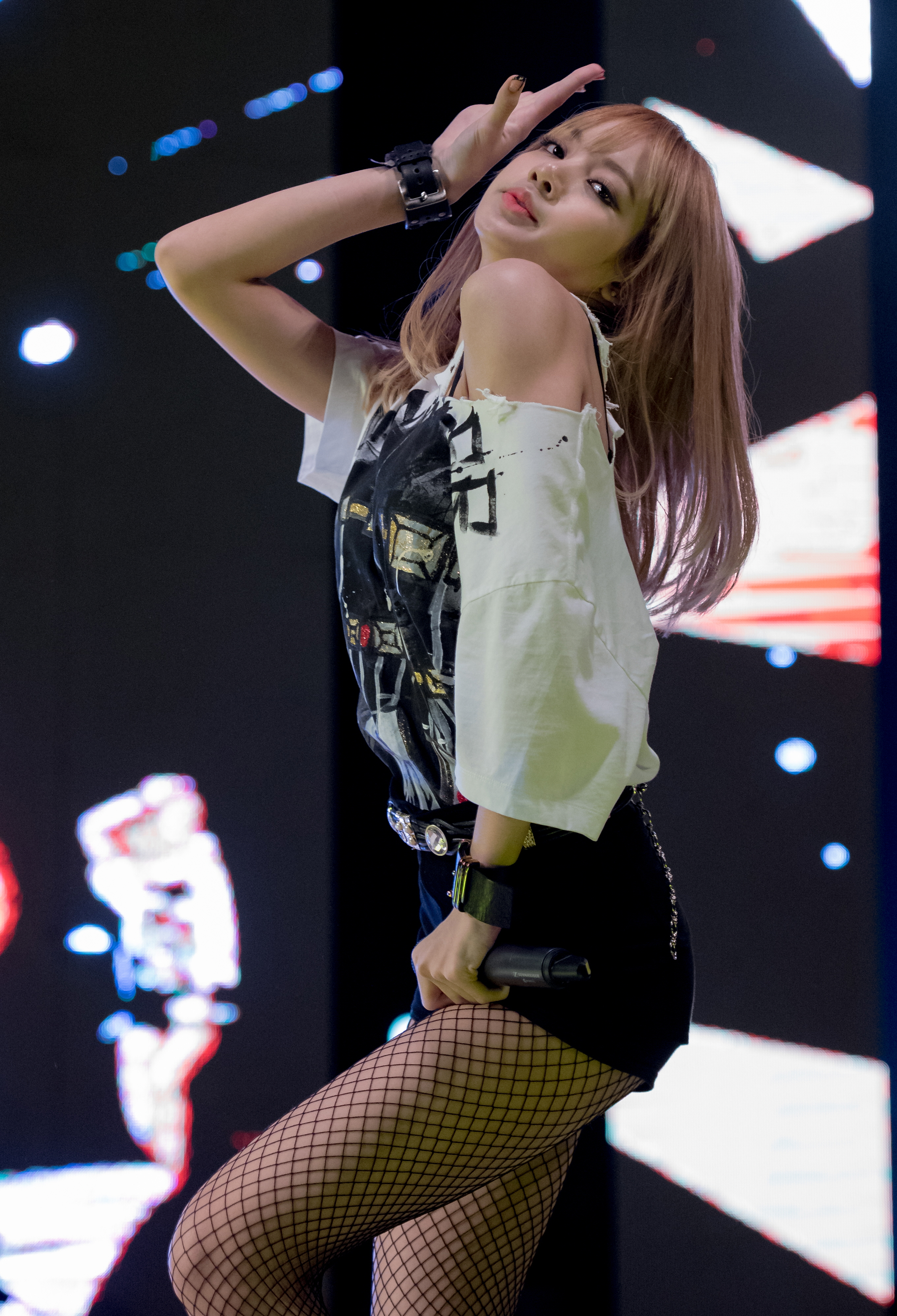
Lisa performing in May 2017

In August 2016, Lisa debuted as one of four members of South Korean girl group Blackpink, the first non-ethnically Korean artist under the label. The group's debut single album Square One featured lead singles "Whistle", which topped all South Korean charts upon debut, and "Boombayah". In 2018, Blackpink signed with Interscope Records in a global partnership with YG Entertainment.

Lisa became a permanent cast member on the Korea Army Academy edition of the Munhwa Broadcasting Corporation military variety program Real Man 300 from 21 September 2018, onward. Her first role on a television program since her debut, it earned her the unofficial Character of the Year award at the 2018 MBC Entertainment Awards. On 5 November 2018, Lisa unveiled her YouTube channel, Lilifilm Official, focusing on travelling, lifestyle, and dance. As of July 2019, she has over 1.3 million subscribers and received a YouTube Gold Play Button. One of her dance performance videos went viral in 2020 as a result of a meme derived from the video; celebrities such as Dolly Parton, Stephen Colbert, James Corden, Luke Evans, and Lil Nas X participated in the trend. In March 2020, Lisa served as the dance mentor on iQIYI's Chinese girl group survival program Youth With You Season 2. In February 2021, she returned as a dance mentor in the show's third season for boy groups.

On 19 April 2021, YG Entertainment revealed to The Korea Herald that Lisa would be the third member of Blackpink to debut as a soloist, with the official schedule to be announced later. On 12 July, through Star News, the label revealed that filming for her music video was underway. Lisa's debut single album Lalisa and its lead single of the same name were released on 10 September 2021. The music video for "Lalisa" became the most-viewed video by a soloist in 24 hours with 73.6 million views, breaking the record held by Taylor Swift's "Me!" featuring Brendon Urie, for which she earned two Guinness World Records. The song debuted at number 84 on the US Billboard Hot 100 and at number two on the Billboard Global 200, becoming Lisa's first top-ten song on the latter. The album sold 736,221 copies in South Korea in its first week, setting the record for the highest first-week sales among female artists domestically and making Lisa the first female soloist to surpass the 500,000-copy mark in one week.

The album's B-side track "Money" received an exclusive dance performance video that was released to YouTube on September 24. The song witnessed a surge in popularity after it became viral on social media, and began to rise in the international charts. As a result, Interscope Records sent the song to US contemporary hit radio on November 9, 2021, as the album's second single. The single peaked at number ten on the Billboard Global 200, becoming Lisa's second top-ten hit after "Lalisa". In the US, it became Lisa's second career solo entry on the Billboard Hot 100 and the first song by a female K-pop soloist to chart for multiple weeks on the chart at the time. "Money" peaked at number 46 on the UK Singles Chart and charted for eight weeks, becoming the longest-charting female K-pop soloist song in the country at the time as well.

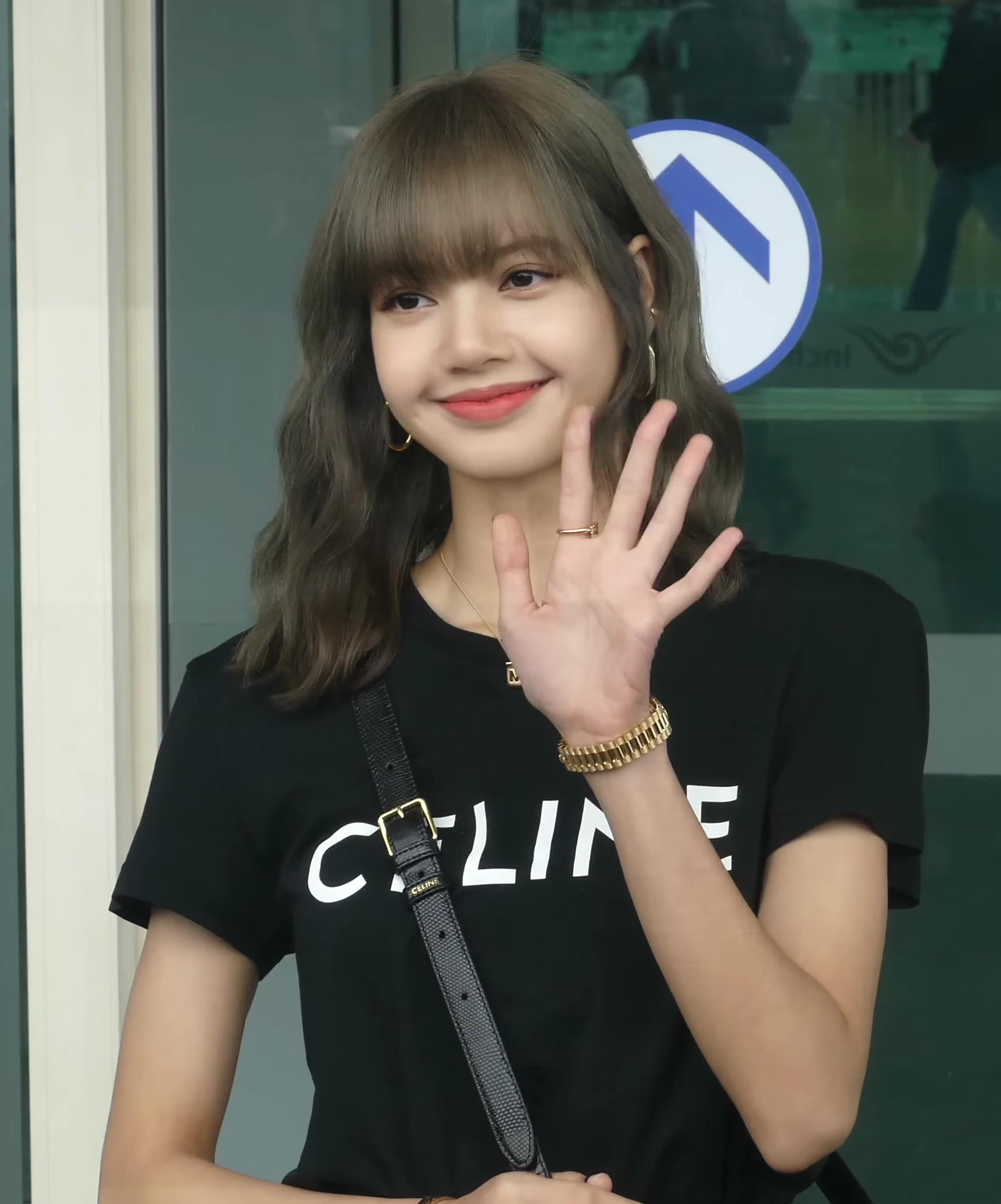
Lisa at Incheon Airport in June 2019

Lisa collaborated with French record producer DJ Snake, Puerto Rican singer Ozuna, and American rapper Megan Thee Stallion on the song "SG", which was released on 22 October 2021, and became Lisa's first number-one song on the Latin Airplay chart. On 28 August 2022, Lisa won the MTV Video Music Award for Best K-Pop for "Lalisa" and became the first K-pop solo artist to win an MTV Video Music Award. On 13 November, she won the MTV Europe Music Award for Best K-Pop and became the first solo K-pop artist in history to win an MTV Europe Music Award as well. Lisa was awarded two Guinness World Records in 2023 for the achievements, in addition to a third for becoming the most followed K-pop artist on Instagram.

Lisa featured on BigBang member Taeyang's song "Shoong!", an album track from his second extended play Down to Earth, which was released on 25 April 2023, alongside a performance video. Lisa was awarded two further Guinness World Records in May for the fastest solo female K-pop artist to reach 1 billion streams and the first album by a solo K-pop artist to reach 1 billion streams on Spotify with Lalisa. With this, she became the K-pop soloist with the most Guinness World Records in history, winning seven as compared to former record-holder Psy's five.

In September 2023, Lisa headlined five performances for the Parisian cabaret Crazy Horse. She performed several solo scenes and appeared with the troupe for original numbers from the cabaret's repertoire, including "But I Am a Good Girl" and "Crisis? What Crisis?" The same month, she earned her eighth Guinness World Record for the first K-pop track by a solo artist to reach 1 billion streams on Spotify with "Money". To celebrate the achievement, Lisa appeared on the fourth episode of Spotify's Billions Club series in November, in which she received a plate-shaped plaque in Paris and cooked a Thai dish for the plate.

On 22 November 2023, Lisa was invested by King Charles III as an Honorary Member of the Order of the British Empire (MBE) alongside her bandmates during a special investiture at Buckingham Palace which was also attended by South Korean president Yoon Suk Yeol. On 5 December, YG Entertainment announced that Lisa along with the other members of Blackpink had renewed their contracts for group activities and that the members' individual contracts were still under discussion. YG Entertainment subsequently confirmed on December 29 that Lisa and the other Blackpink members agreed not to proceed with a contract with the label for individual activities.

=== 2024–2025: Self-management, Alter Ego and acting debut ===
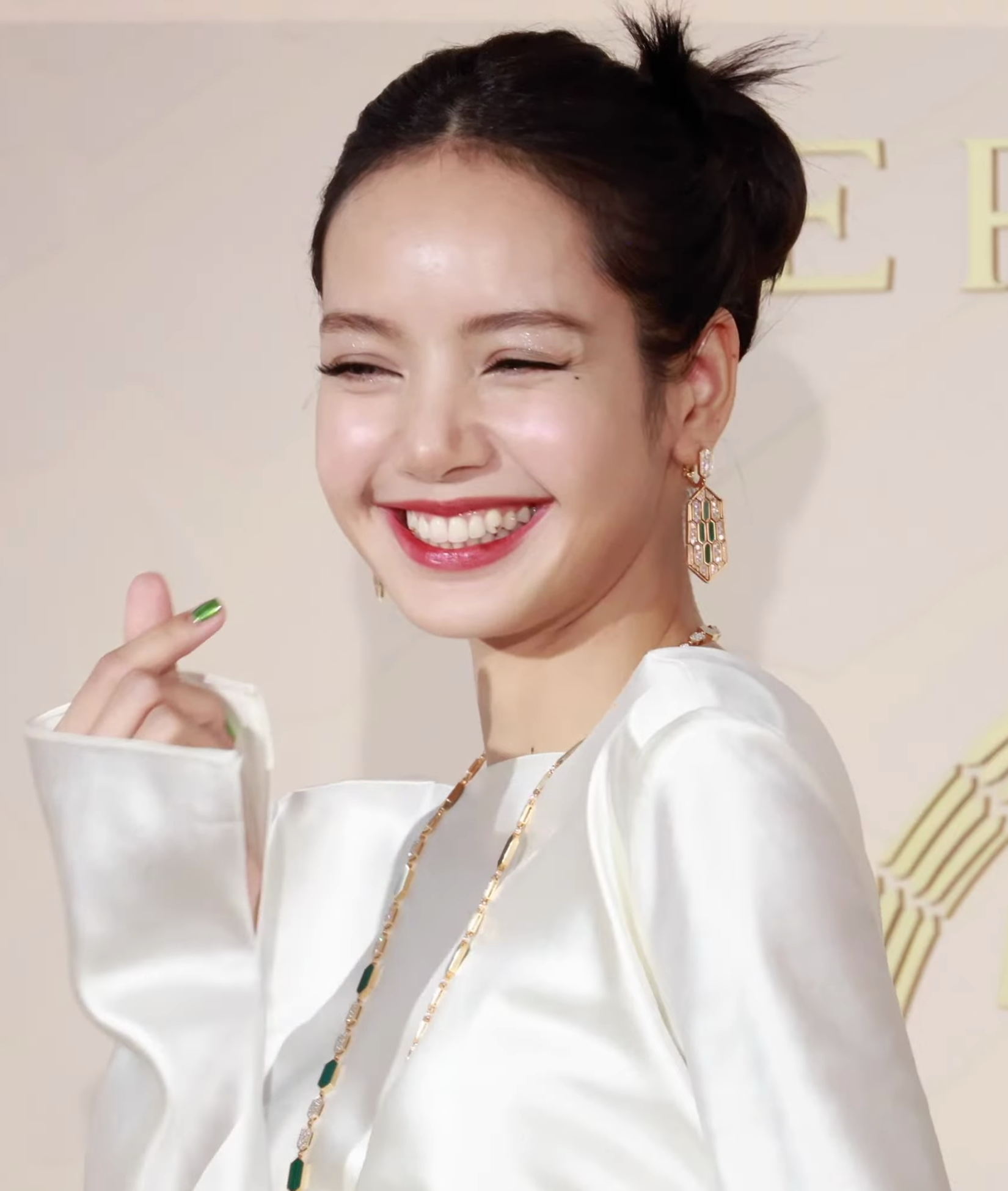
Lisa at a Bulgari exhibition in June 2023

Lisa headlined the Le Gala des Pièces Jaunes charity event organized by Brigitte Macron, the first lady of France, in Paris on 26 January 2024, where she performed a medley of her solo singles "Lalisa" and "Money". At the event, she also made a surprise appearance during DJ Snake's set, in which they performed "SG" live for the first time together. On 8 February, Lisa announced that she launched her own artist management company, called Lloud. On 10 April, it was announced that under a partnership with Lloud, she had joined RCA Records to release solo music; she will have full ownership of all of her recordings as part of the deal.

Lisa began teasing new music on 6 June by creating a new TikTok account and posting a video paired with a teaser snippet, which led her to set a Guinness World Record by gaining a million followers in just two hours and 18 minutes. She released "Rockstar" through Lloud and RCA on 27 June as the lead single from her debut studio album Alter Ego. It was accompanied by a music video which was filmed in Bangkok and paid homage to her Thai culture. "Rockstar" debuted at number four on the Billboard Global 200 and at number one on the Billboard Global Excl. US, becoming Lisa's third top-ten hit on both charts and her first number-one hit on the latter chart. It also debuted at number 70 on the US Billboard Hot 100, marking Lisa's highest-charting song and her third entry on the chart.

On August 15, Lisa released the album's second single "New Woman" featuring Spanish singer Rosalía. The song debuted at number six on the Billboard Global Excl. US and became Lisa's fourth entry on the US Billboard Hot 100. She performed at the 2024 MTV Video Music Awards on 11 September, which marked her debut major performance as a solo artist and made her the first K-pop soloist in history to perform on the show. "Rockstar" received four nominations at the ceremony and won the award for Best K-Pop, making Lisa the first solo artist to win the award twice.

Lisa headlined the Global Citizen Festival on 28 September, her first solo performance at a festival. During the performance, she surprise debuted a new song titled "Moonlit Floor (Kiss Me)", which was released afterwards on 3 October as the third single from Alter Ego. She also performed at the Victoria's Secret Fashion Show 2024 on October 15. Lisa subsequently embarked on her 2024 'Fan Meetup' tour in Asia, which comprised five shows starting 11 November. On New Year's Eve 2024, she headlined the Amazing Thailand Countdown 2025 event in Bangkok.

On February 6, 2025, Lisa released "Born Again" featuring American rapper Doja Cat and British singer Raye as the fourth single from Alter Ego. The song became her first number-one single on the newly launched Official Thailand Chart, and her fifth and highest-charting entry on the Billboard Hot 100 at number 68. At the 2025 MTV Video Music Awards, it became Lisa's third song to win Best K-Pop. As a result, she tied BTS as the most-awarded artist in the category. She made her acting debut under her given name Lalisa Manobal as Mook in the third season of the HBO television series The White Lotus, which premiered on February 16.

Lisa released her debut album Alter Ego on 28 February 2025, to mixed reviews from music critics. It debuted at number seven on the US Billboard 200 and number one on the Top Album Sales chart. "Fxck Up the World" featuring American rapper Future was released as the fifth single alongside the album release. The singer also announced the launch of her comic company Lalisa Comics in partnership with Zero Zero Entertainment on February 18. The company's first release on March 24 was a graphic novel titled Alter-Ego: The Official Comic, a companion to the album authored by Lisa and illustrated by Minomiyabi. On 2 March, Lisa performed at the 97th Academy Awards, making her the first K-pop singer to perform at the ceremony. On 11 and 18 April l, she performed songs from Alter Ego at Coachella 2025.

Lisa featured on American band Maroon 5's song "Priceless", released on 2 May as the lead single from their eighth studio album Love Is Like (2025), which became her sixth entry on the Billboard Hot 100. On 16 May, she released a music video for the album track "When I'm with You" featuring South African singer Tyla. Lisa later premiered a short film for the album track "Dream" on 13 August, starring herself with Japanese actor Kentaro Sakaguchi. Following its release, the song peaked at number one on the Official Thailand Chart, earning her second chart-topper. On 29 September, Lisa signed with the talent agency WME for representation in her acting endeavors. She additionally signed with the booking agency Wasserman Music for touring representation globally on 22 October.

=== 2026–present: Press Play, residency and film debut ===
Lisa performing on her Las Vegas residency Viva La Lisa in November 2026

Netflix announced on 4 December that Lisa would make her film debut starring alongside Don Lee and Lee Jin-wook in Tygo, a spin-off in the Extraction franchise. On 11 January 2026, Lisa appeared in person at the 83rd Golden Globe Awards as a presenter for Best Actor – Television Series Drama alongside Priyanka Chopra. On 5 February, it was announced that Lisa would be starring in a "Notting Hill-inspired" romantic comedy film for Netflix, produced by David Bernad, an executive producer on The White Lotus.

Lisa collaborated with Italian-American electronic music producer Anyma on the single "Bad Angel", which was released on 8 April. She made a surprise appearance during Anyma's set at Coachella 2026 on April 18 to perform the song live. On 21 May, Lisa released the single "Goals" with Brazilian singer Anitta and Nigerian singer Rema as an official soundtrack of the 2026 FIFA World Cup. They performed "Goals" as headliners for the FIFA World Cup opening ceremony in Los Angeles on 12 June, making Lisa the first female K-pop act and the first Thai artist to headline a FIFA opening ceremony in history.

On 3 September 2026, Lisa released "Sawadika" as the lead single of her first extended play Press Play. Its music video garnerned 73.3 million views on YouTube in 24 hours, becoming the biggest music video debut of 2026 and the second most-viewed debut by a soloist in history behind her own song "Lalisa". The song debuted at number three on the Official Thailand Chart and became her seventh entry and highest-charting solo song on the Billboard Hot 100 at number 69.

Lisa featured in the documentary film Always Lalisa, directed by Sue Kim, which chronicled a year in her life as she pursued her solo career. The film premiered at the 2026 Toronto International Film Festival, before receiving a limited theatrical release on 12 October. Lisa performed "Sawadika" at the 2026 MTV Video Music Awards on 27 September. At the ceremony, she received four nominations for "Dream" and won Best Pop, making Lisa the first K-pop soloist to win the category.

Lisa released her first extended play Press Play on 23 October alongside its second single "Tarantino", which debuted at number five on the Official Thailand Chart. In support of the EP, she embarked on the concert residency Viva La Lisa from 13 to 29 November, making her the first K-pop artist in history to stage a Las Vegas residency. Simultaneously with the streaming release of the film Always Lalisa on YouTube Premium, Lisa released the single "Leave with Me" on 18 November, which was made for and featured in the documentary in its closing credits.

== Fashion and endorsements ==
Throughout her career, Lisa's fashion image has been widely covered by fashion journalists and international media. She has been named the global ambassador and endorser of several fashion brands, including Louis Vuitton, Bulgari, and Nike, among others. Internationally, she has been selected to be the face of numerous fashion campaigns and collections, in addition to her features on fashion magazine covers and articles.

In January 2019, Lisa became the muse of Hedi Slimane, the artistic, creative and image director of the French luxury fashion brand Celine. Following her appearance in the brand's Essentials campaign, photographed by Slimane in June 2020, she was named global ambassador in September 2020. On 16 February 2021, Lisa joined the guest jury for the French fashion award ANDAM. Lisa became a member of the 2026 Met Gala host committee.

=== Bulgari ===
In July 2020, Lisa was officially appointed as a brand ambassador for Bulgari, the Italian luxury fashion house, and appeared in digital campaigns for its Serpenti and Bzero One collections. She has been associated with the brand for several years and is often seen representing them at high-profile events and in promotional campaigns. Her role as global ambassador includes showcasing Bvlgari's jewelry, watches, and other products. In June 2022, Lisa and Anne Hathaway attended Bvlgari Eden The Garden of Wonders. In May 2023, she attended the jeweler's Mediterranean high jewelry event in Venice. In May 2025, she attended Bulgari's High Jewelry Show.

Lisa collaborated with Bulgari twice for its limited-edition watch in 2023 and 2025, respectively.

=== Louis Vuitton ===
In July 2024, she became a house ambassador for Louis Vuitton. Lisa had also attended Louis Vuitton's Autumn/Winter 2024 show in March 2024. After Lisa's official ambassadorship with Louis Vuitton was announced in July 2024, Lisa was present at the Louis Vuitton Spring/Summer 2025 show during Paris Fashion Week and had been featured in Louis Vuitton campaigns, including the Spring/Summer 2025 collection alongside Saoirse Ronan.

In September 2024, she attended 2024 MTV Video Music Awards wearing Louis Vuitton. In October 2024, Lisa attended the Louis Vuitton Spring/Summer 2025 Womenswear show. Lisa also made her Met Gala debut in Louis Vuitton.

=== Nike ===
In January 2026, she became a house ambassador for Nike and became its NikeSKIMS spokesperson.

== Other ventures ==
=== Endorsements ===
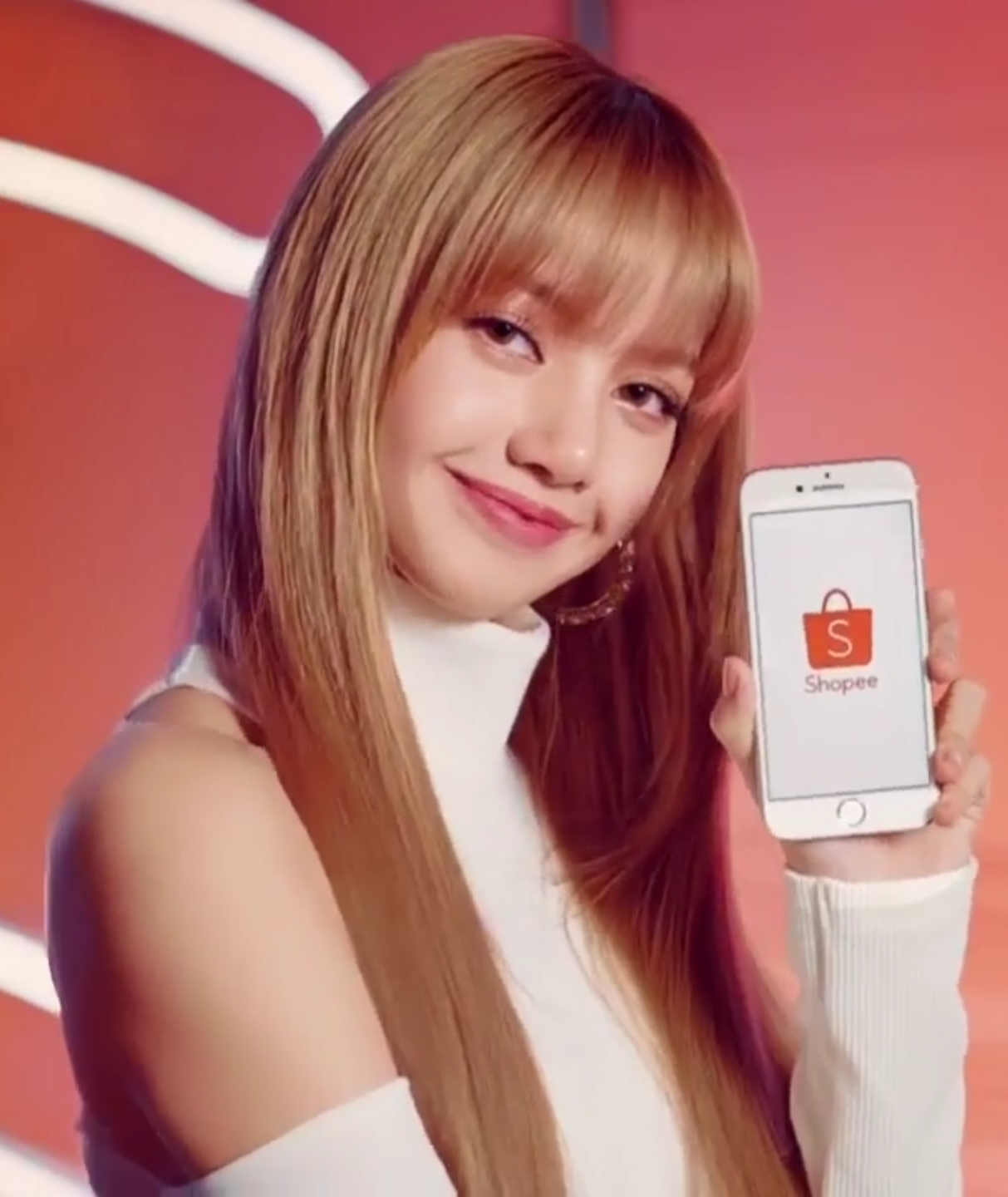
Lisa for a Shopee event in 2018

Through her work as a model for the South Korean cosmetics brand Moonshot, she became their brand ambassador in China on March 21, 2018. On July 25, 2019, Lisa became the brand ambassador and presenter for the new collection launched in Thailand, in which six of the products include her autograph as part of the packaging. On 28 March 2019, Lisa signed her first solo endorsement deal for Advanced Info Service (AIS), the largest GSM mobile phone operator in Thailand. She became its highest-paid brand presenter, and her advertising campaign was the highest-rated commercial in Thailand. On May 11, 2019, Lisa began endorsing the Samsung Galaxy S10 in Thailand. Her first promotional material for the brand was released on 14 May. Lisa also featured as an endorsement model for the mobile game Ragnarok M: Eternal Love, appearing as a character on their Midnight Party server beginning on 24 July 2019.

In January 2020, Lisa joined labelmate Mino of South Korean boy band Winner as an endorsement model for sportswear brand Adidas' SS20 season My Shelter clothing range. She was revealed as a brand spokesperson in China for the fabric softener company D&G Downy on May 13, soon also becoming a brand spokesperson for Zhengouli, the yoghurt brand of Mengniu Dairy, one of China's largest dairy companies. On June 27, Tencent Games announced Lisa as Supercell's newest spokesperson in China for their mobile game Brawl Stars. In October 2020, Lauder-owned MAC Cosmetics named Lisa their newest global brand ambassador; she served as muse and face of many of their collections and key campaigns. Of Lisa, Senior Vice President and Global Creative Director Drew Elliott stated, "Always confident and never one to shy away from risks, she embodies our commitment to celebrating individuality and self-expression above all else."

On 22 February 2021, Lisa was announced as the endorsement model for the Vivo S9 smartphone, having endorsed the Vivo S7 smartphone in 2020. In March 2022, she became the brand ambassador to whiskey brand Chivas Regal and starred in the I Rise, We Rise campaign. In September 2024, she starred in a campaign for the American earbuds brand Bose, promoting its Ultra Open Earbuds.

in November 2020, the clothing brand Penshoppe introduced her as their newest ambassador.

On 13 November 2021, she announced her own makeup collection with American beauty brand MAC Cosmetics, titled MAC X L. The line features powder blushes, eyeliner, an eyeshadow palette, and a face powder.

=== Photography ===
Through YG Entertainment, Lisa released the limited-edition book 0327, composed entirely of self-taken photographs with a film camera. A first volume was released on her birthday in 2020, followed by a second on her birthday the following year. Volumes three and four were released in 2022 and 2023, respectively.

=== Philanthropy ===
In September 2021, Lisa expressed interest in joining a social program led by the Korean Foundation for International Cultural Exchange in partnership with YG Entertainment for Buriram Province, soon launching an online account to help collect donations. The partnership between the foundation and YG Entertainment aims to build a 160-square-meter cultural compound at Non Suwan Phitthayakhom School in Buriram; provide computers, projectors and other multimedia equipment to the school; and establish a K-pop dance academy staffed by local instructors.

In July 2024, she was announced as a headliner for the Global Citizen Festival, an event part of a mission to end extreme poverty, which took place on 28 September.

== Impact ==
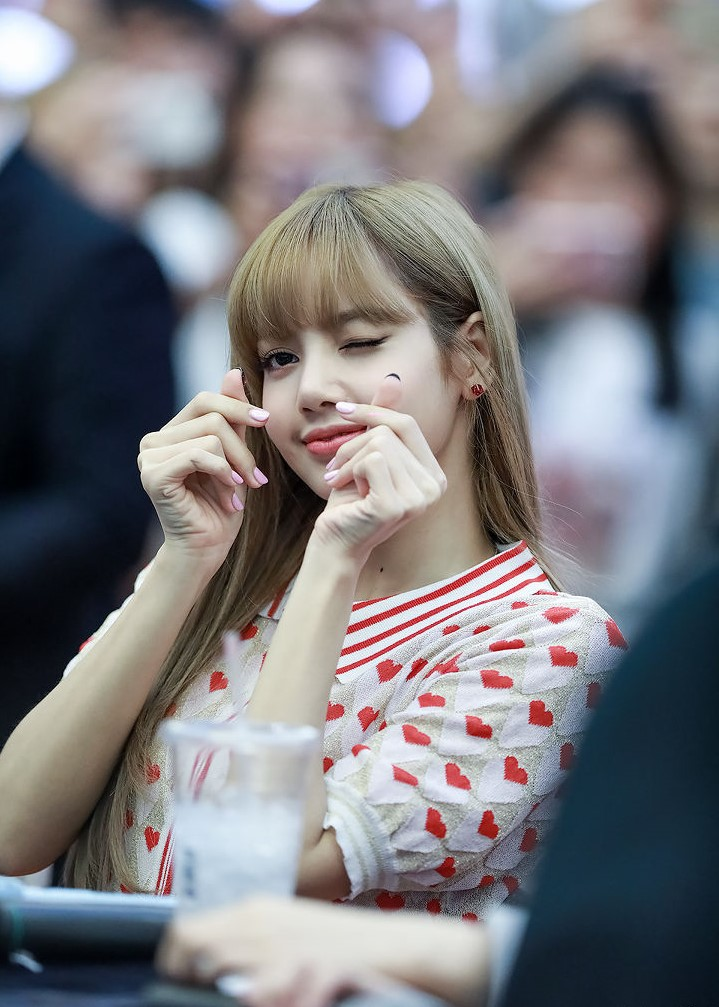
Lisa at a fan sign event at the AK Plaza in 2018

Lisa has been cited as an influence by other performers in the K-pop industry. Gaga of girl group Nature and Mayna of girl group Hot Issue both named Lisa as their role model. Destiny Rogers' song "Tomboy" experienced a 1939% increase in daily streams on Spotify and entered the iTunes and Apple Music charts of various countries following a dance performance video uploaded by Lisa to her YouTube channel. Rogers herself expressed gratitude toward Lisa on Twitter for revitalizing the song. Lisa was praised by Thai prime minister Prayut Chan-o-cha for promoting Thai culture in her "Lalisa" music video. Due to the cultural references in "Lalisa" music video, it was reported that there was an increase in sales of traditional Thai costumes and accessories by local markets in Bangkok. In March 2021, Lisa, along with other five Thai celebrities, was awarded the "Inspirational Role Model" Award, given by the Children and Youth Development Club organization, in recognition of her work as a leader and role model for the new generations in Thailand. In 2023, she was honored by Thailand's Ministry of Culture with an honorary Wattanakunathorn Award (Cultural Ambassador Leader) in honor of her role as a "leading force promoting Thailand to the world through soft power to increase the value of the economy."

Lisa became the most-followed K-pop idol on Instagram in April 2019, with 17.4 million followers at the time, and later became the first K-pop idol to surpass 50 million Instagram followers in April 2021. In January 2023, she was awarded a Guinness World Record for being the most followed K-pop artist on the platform, with 87 million followers at the time. As of September 2021, Lisa also held the record for the most-subscribed female K-pop soloist on YouTube with her channel Lilifilm Official, which had 8.24 million subscribers. Lisa's commercial influence and marketing potential have been noted by media outlets and cited as an example of changing promotional strategies in the fashion and makeup industries. Upon landing her first solo magazine cover shoot with Harper's Bazaar Thailand for their May 2019 issue, the magazine's distributor reported that all 120,000 printed and in-stock copies sold out. Generally, it is reported that 30k copies (per issue) are printed, with well-known celebrities possibly having an average of 60k copies printed. However, despite selling 120k copies, the public's demand for Lisa was still not met.

Following Lisa's appearance at and social media posts from the Celine Men's Spring Summer 2020 Collection fashion show in France during Paris Fashion Week, it was reported that global searches for Celine's Triomphe bag leapt 66% on June 28, 2019. Lisa's partnership with MAC Cosmetics was named one of the top beauty collaborations of 2020 by Launchmetrics according to their Media Impact Value (MIV) algorithm, with the announcement of the partnership becoming MAC Cosmetics' top-branded post of the year. Launchmetrics further partially attributes the success of Lisa's endorsements to their authenticity as she frequently features the same brands across her social media channels. On April 10, 2023, researchers at Chiang Mai University named the Thai flower species Friesodielsia lalisae in Lisa's honor. That October, Lisa was named one of the 2023 inductees into the Asian Hall of Fame, alongside the likes of Freddie Mercury and Ryuichi Sakamoto. Lisa and her bandmates in Blackpink received the fourth-class Okgwan Order of Cultural Merit at the 2026 Korean Popular Culture and Arts Awards.

== Discography ==
- Alter Ego (2025)

== Filmography ==
Key
| † | Denotes productions that have not yet been released |

=== Film ===
| Year | Title | Role | Notes | Ref. |
|---|---|---|---|---|
| 2026 | Always Lalisa | Herself | Documentary film | |
| TBA | Tygo † | Ria | Post-production | |

=== Television ===
| Year | Title | Role | Notes | Ref. |
|---|---|---|---|---|
| 2017 | Charm TV | Herself (cast member) | Lisa TV segment; three episodes | |
| 2018 | Real Man 300 | Herself (cast member) | Korea Army Academy Edition | |
| 2020–2021 | Youth With You | Herself (dance mentor) | Seasons 2–3 | |
| 2025 | The White Lotus | Thidapon "Mook" Sornsin | Season 3; credited as Lalisa Manobal | |
| 2025 | Hitmakers | Herself | Episode: "Ending on an Upbeat" | |

== Bibliography ==
- Alter Ego: The Official Comic (2025)

== Live performances ==
=== Concert residencies ===
| Title | Date | Venue | City | Shows | Ref. |
|---|---|---|---|---|---|
| Viva La Lisa | November 12, 2026 – November 29, 2026 | The Colosseum at Caesars Palace | Paradise, Nevada | 6 | |

=== Fanmeeting tours ===
| Title | Date | City | Country | Venue | Ref. |
|---|---|---|---|---|---|
| Fan Meetup in Asia | November 11, 2024 | Singapore | | Singapore Indoor Stadium | |
| Fan Meetup in Asia | November 13, 2024 | Bangkok | Thailand | BITEC Live | |
| Fan Meetup in Asia | November 15, 2024 | Jakarta | Indonesia | Beach City International Stadium | |
| Fan Meetup in Asia | November 17, 2024 | Kaohsiung | Taiwan | Kaohsiung Arena | |
| Fan Meetup in Asia | November 19, 2024 | Hong Kong | China | AsiaWorld–Arena | |

=== Music festivals ===
| Event | Date | City | Country | Venue | Performed song(s) | Ref. |
|---|---|---|---|---|---|---|
| Global Citizen Festival | September 28, 2024 | New York City | United States | Central Park | "Lalisa"; "Money"; "Moonlit Floor (Kiss Me)"; "New Woman"; "Rockstar" | |
| Amazing Thailand Countdown | December 31, 2024 | Bangkok | Thailand | Iconsiam | "Lalisa"; "Money"; "Moonlit Floor (Kiss Me) (Santa Baby Remix)"; "New Woman"; "Rockstar" | |
| Coachella 2025 | April 11, 2025 – April 18, 2025 | Indio | United States | Empire Polo Club | "Thunder"; "Fxck Up the World"; "Lalisa"; "New Woman"; "When I'm with You"; "Dream"; "Moonlit Floor (Kiss Me)"; "Chill"; "Elastigirl"; "Money"; "Born Again"; "Lifestyle"; "Rockstar" | |
| Coachella 2026 (Note: Lisa appeared as a surprise guest performer during Anyma's set on the second weekend of Coachella 2026.) | April 18, 2026 | Indio | United States | Empire Polo Club | "Bad Angel" (with Anyma) | |

=== Award shows ===
| Event | Date | City | Country | Performed song(s) | Ref. |
|---|---|---|---|---|---|
| 2024 MTV Video Music Awards | September 11, 2024 | Elmont | United States | "New Woman"; "Rockstar" | |
| 97th Academy Awards | March 2, 2025 | Los Angeles | United States | "Live and Let Die" | |
| 2026 MTV Video Music Awards | September 27, 2026 | Los Angeles | United States | "Sawadika" | |

=== Television shows and specials ===
| Event | Date | City | Country | Performed song(s) | Ref. |
|---|---|---|---|---|---|
| The Tonight Show Starring Jimmy Fallon | September 10, 2021 | New York City | United States | "Lalisa" | |
| Inkigayo | September 19, 2021 | Seoul | South Korea | "Lalisa" | |
| Show! Music Core | September 25, 2021 | Seoul | South Korea | "Lalisa" | |
| Inkigayo | September 26, 2021 | Seoul | South Korea | "Lalisa" | |
| Le Gala des Pièces Jaunes | January 26, 2024 | Paris | France | "SG" (with DJ Snake); "Lalisa"; "Money" | |
| Victoria's Secret Fashion Show | October 15, 2024 | New York City | United States | "Rockstar"; "Moonlit Floor (Kiss Me)" | |

=== Other live performances ===
| Event | Date | City | Country | Performed song(s) | Ref. |
|---|---|---|---|---|---|
| 2026 FIFA World Cup opening ceremony | June 12, 2026 | Los Angeles | United States | "Goals" (with Anitta and Rema) | |

== See also ==
- List of artists who reached number one on the UK Singles Downloads Chart
