= Jennie discography =

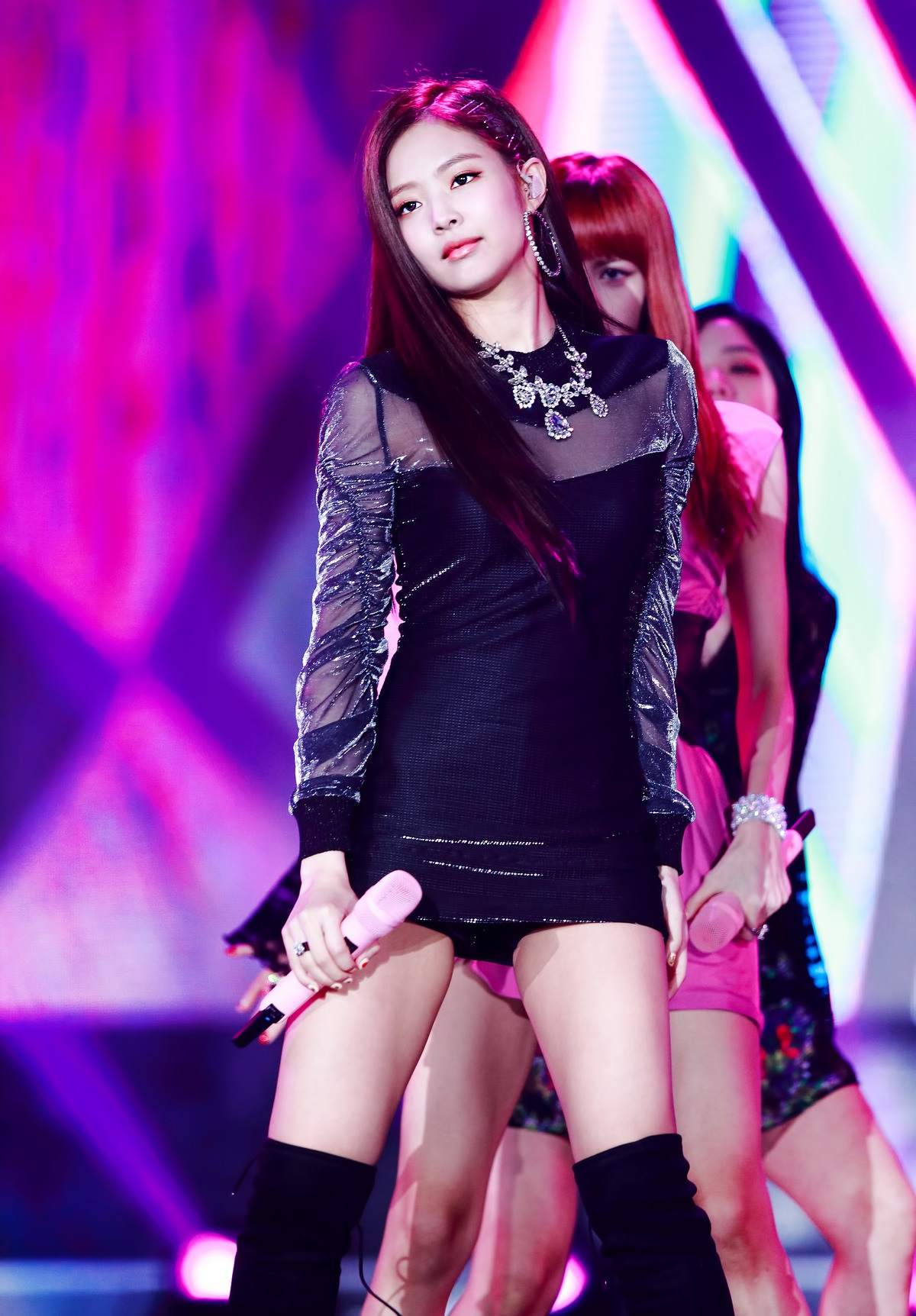
- Jennie in 2017
- Studio albums: 1
- EPs: 1
- Singles: 15
- Music videos: 13
- Single albums: 1

South Korean singer and rapper Jennie has released one studio album, one extended play, one single album, and fifteen singles (including two as a featured artist).

Jennie began her career as a member of girl group Blackpink in August 2016. She released her debut solo single "Solo" through YG Entertainment and Interscope Records in November 2018. It reached number one on South Korea's Circle Digital Chart, the Billboard K-pop Hot 100, and the US Billboard World Digital Songs chart, marking the first time a lead female K-pop soloist topped the latter. The song has been certified platinum in South Korea for 2.5 million downloads and 100 million streams, as well as gold in Japan. Its accompanying single album debuted at number two on the Circle Album Chart and was certified platinum for surpassing 250,000 copies sold in South Korea. In 2023, Jennie released the single "You & Me", which debuted at number seven on the Billboard Global 200 and number one on the Global Excl. US, becoming her first number-one hit on the latter chart. It also reached number four on the Circle Digital Chart and number 39 on the UK Singles Chart. Her 2023 single "One of the Girls" with the Weeknd and Lily-Rose Depp peaked at number ten on the Billboard Global 200 and became the highest-charting song by a female K-pop soloist on the US Billboard Hot 100 at number 51 as well as the first to be certified platinum in the country. She earned her second number-one single on the Circle Digital Chart and Billboard World Digital Songs with her feature on Zico's "Spot!" in 2024.

Jennie released her debut studio album Ruby in 2025 through her self-founded label Odd Atelier and Columbia Records. It sold more than one million copies worldwide and debuted in the top ten in more than 19 countries including Australia, France, Germany, the Netherlands, New Zealand, South Korea, the United States, and the United Kingdom, where it became the highest-charting album by a K-pop female soloist. The lead single "Mantra" peaked at number three on the Billboard Global 200 and Circle Digital Chart and broke the record for the highest-charting song by a Korean female soloist on the UK Singles Chart at number 37. The album's fourth single "Like Jennie" became her third number-one song on the Circle Digital Chart and peaked at number five on the Billboard Global 200, while all five singles entered the Billboard Hot 100. In 2026, Jennie achieved her first top-ten hit on the Billboard Hot 100 with her remix of Tame Impala's "Dracula", which additionally peaked at number two on the Billboard Global 200.

== Albums ==
=== Studio albums ===
List of studio albums, with selected details, selected chart positions, sales, and certifications
Title	Details	Peak chart positions										Sales	Certifications
Title	Details	KOR	AUS	CAN	FRA	GER	JPN	NLD	NZ	UK	US	Sales	Certifications
Ruby	Released: March 7, 2025; Label: Odd Atelier, Columbia; Formats: CD, LP, cassette, digital download, streaming	2	2	6	4	6	21	5	2	3	7	KOR: 905,799; JPN: 10,639 (Note: Japanese sales of Ruby: Physical sales: 10,186; Digital sales: 453); US: 26,500; WW: 1,000,000	KMCA: 3× Platinum; BPI: Silver; RIAA: Gold; RMNZ: Gold; SNEP: Gold

== Extended plays ==
List of extended plays, with selected details
Title	Details	Peak chart positions		Sales
Title	Details	KOR	JPN	Sales
Fallen Angel	Released: August 28, 2026; Label: Odd Atelier, Columbia; Formats: CD, LP, digital download, streaming	6	56	KOR: 203,962

== Single albums ==
List of single albums, with selected details, selected chart positions, sales, and certifications
Title	Details	Peak chart positions	Sales	Certifications
Title	Details	KOR	Sales	Certifications
Solo	Released: November 12, 2018; Label: YG, Interscope; Formats: CD, digital download, streaming	2	KOR: 250,000	KMCA: Platinum

== Singles ==
=== As lead artist ===
List of singles as lead artist, with year released, selected chart positions, sales, certifications, and album name
Title	Year	Peak chart positions										Sales	Certifications	Album
Title	Year	KOR	AUS	CAN	HK	MLY	NZ	SGP	UK	US	WW	Sales	Certifications	Album
"Solo"	2018	1	—	67	—	2	— (Note: "Solo" did not enter the NZ Top 40 Singles Chart, but peaked at number 13 on the NZ Hot 40 Singles Chart.)	2	— (Note: "Solo" did not enter the UK Singles Chart, but peaked at number 72 on the UK Singles Downloads Chart.)	—	— (Note: "Solo" did not enter the Billboard Global 200, but peaked at number 1 on the World Digital Song Sales chart.)	KOR: 2,500,000; US: 10,000	KMCA: Platinum (Note: Streaming certification); KMCA: Platinum (Note: Download certification); RMNZ: Gold	Non-album singles
"You & Me"	2023	4	69	71	1	—	— (Note: "You & Me" did not enter the NZ Top 40 Singles Chart, but peaked at number 5 on the NZ Hot 40 Singles Chart.)	1	39	— (Note: "You & Me" did not enter the Billboard Hot 100, but peaked at number 2 on the Bubbling Under Hot 100 chart.)	7	US: 4,348		Non-album singles
"One of the Girls" (with the Weeknd and Lily-Rose Depp)	2023	158	30	29	—	1	28	5	21	51	10	US: 1,000	ARIA: Gold; BPI: Platinum; RIAA: Platinum; RMNZ: 3× Platinum	The Idol Episode 4 (Music from the HBO Original Series)
"Slow Motion" (with Matt Champion)	2024	— (Note: "Slow Motion" did not enter the Circle Digital Chart, but peaked at number 116 on the Circle Download Chart.)	—	—	—	—	— (Note: "Slow Motion" did not enter the NZ Top 40 Singles Chart, but peaked at number 28 on the NZ Hot 40 Singles Chart.)	—	— (Note: "Slow Motion" did not enter the UK Singles Chart, but peaked at number 68 on the UK Singles Downloads Chart.)	—	—			Mika's Laundry
"Mantra"	2024	3	52	46	1	2	32	2	37	98	3	US: 3,100; WW: 15,000	MC: Gold; RIAA: Gold; RMNZ: Gold	Ruby
"Love Hangover" (featuring Dominic Fike)	2025	35	—	72	10	9	— (Note: "Love Hangover" did not enter the NZ Top 40 Singles Chart, but peaked at number 7 on the NZ Hot 40 Singles Chart.)	5	64	96	29			Ruby
"ExtraL" (featuring Doechii)	2025	42	64	58	13	9	— (Note: "ExtraL" did not enter the NZ Top 40 Singles Chart, but peaked at number 5 on the NZ Hot 40 Singles Chart.)	8	37	75	18		RIAA: Gold	Ruby
"Like Jennie"	2025	1	35	42	1	1	31	2	36	83	5	WW: 6,000	BPI: Silver; MC: Gold; RIAA: Platinum; RMNZ: Platinum	Ruby
"Handlebars" (featuring Dua Lipa)	2025	68	63	47	6	7	— (Note: "Handlebars" did not enter the NZ Top 40 Singles Chart, but peaked at number 3 on the NZ Hot 40 Singles Chart.)	5	41	80	21			Ruby
"Dracula" (remix with Tame Impala)	2026	— (Note: "Dracula" (remix) did not enter the Circle Digital Chart, but peaked at number 117 on the Circle Download Chart.)	—	2	14	—	— (Note: "Dracula" (remix) did not enter the NZ Top 40 Singles Chart, but peaked at number 7 on the NZ Hot 40 Singles Chart.)	—	—	3	2	US: 7,700; WW: 3,000	RIAA: Platinum	Non-album single
"Less Than a Lover"	2026	17	64	82	1	3	— (Note: "Less Than a Lover" did not enter the NZ Top 40 Singles Chart, but peaked at number 5 on the NZ Hot 40 Singles Chart.)	2	— (Note: "Less Than a Lover" did not enter the UK Singles Chart, but peaked at number 44 on the UK Singles Downloads Chart.)	— (Note: "Less Than a Lover" did not enter the Billboard Hot 100, but peaked at number 7 on the Bubbling Under Hot 100 chart.)	26			Fallen Angel
"Fallen Angel"	2026	42	—	—	6	11	— (Note: "Fallen Angel" did not enter the NZ Top 40 Singles Chart, but peaked at number 5 on the NZ Hot 40 Singles Chart.)	5	—	—	117			Fallen Angel
"Someone to Hold"	2026	— (Note: "Someone to Hold" did not enter the Circle Digital Chart, but peaked at number 50 on the Circle Download Chart.)	—	—	—	—	— (Note: "Someone to Hold" did not enter the NZ Top 40 Singles Chart, but it peaked at number 36 on the NZ Hot Singles Chart.)	—	—	—	—			Steps (Soundtrack from the Netflix Film)
"—" denotes releases that did not chart or were not released in that region.

=== As featured artist ===
List of singles as featured artist, with year released, selected chart positions, sales, and album name
Title	Year	Peak chart positions										Sales	Album
Title	Year	KOR	KOR Billb. (Note: Includes the Billboard K-pop Hot 100 (discontinued since April 30, 2022), and the subsequent South Korea Songs chart (launched in May 7, 2022).)	HK	JPN Hot	MLY	NZ Hot	SGP	TWN	US World	WW	Sales	Album
"Black" (G-Dragon featuring Jennie)	2013	2	3	—	—	—	—	—	—	—	—	KOR: 1,009,720	Coup d'Etat
"Spot!" (Zico featuring Jennie)	2024	1	1	2	69	6	5	5	2	1	24	US: 1,000; WW: 5,000	Non-album single
"—" denotes releases that did not chart or were not released in that region.

== Other charted songs ==
List of other charted songs, with year released, selected chart positions, sales, and album name
Title	Year	Peak chart positions										Sales	Album
Title	Year	KOR	KOR Hot	HK	MLY Int.	NZ Hot	PHL Hot	SGP	TWN	US R&B	WW	Sales	Album
"Special" (Lee Hi featuring Jennie)	2013	21	16	—	—	—	—	—	—	—	—	KOR: 206,840	First Love
"GG Be" (지지베) (Seungri featuring Jennie)	2013	18	38	—	—	—	—	—	—	—	—	KOR: 202,446	Let's Talk About Love
"You & Me" (Coachella version)	2023	— (Note: "You & Me" (Coachella version) did not enter the Circle Digital Chart, but peaked at number 76 on the Circle Download Chart.)	—	—	—	—	—	—	—	—	—		Non-album song
"Mantra" (explicit version)	2024	53	—	—	—	—	—	—	—	—	—		Ruby
"Intro: Jane" (with FKJ)	2025	— (Note: "Intro: Jane" did not enter the Circle Digital Chart, but peaked at number 98 on the Circle Download Chart.)	—	—	—	—	—	—	—	—			Ruby
"Start a War"	2025	110	—	—	14	12	77	23	—	—	158		Ruby
"With the IE (Way Up)"	2025	118	—	—	—	—	89	— (Note: "With the IE (Way Up)" did not enter the Official Singapore Chart, but peaked at number 20 on the Regional Chart.)	—	—	— (Note: "With the IE (Way Up)" did not enter the Billboard Global 200, but peaked at number 144 on the Billboard Global Excl. US.)		Ruby
"Zen"	2025	82	—	—	19	13	100	30	—	—	122		Ruby
"Damn Right" (featuring Childish Gambino and Kali Uchis)	2025	146	—	—	—	—	87	— (Note: "Damn Right" did not enter the Official Singapore Chart, but peaked at number 23 on the Regional Chart.)	—	24	182		Ruby
"F.T.S."	2025	— (Note: "F.T.S." did not enter the Circle Digital Chart, but peaked at number 75 on the Circle Download Chart.)	—	—	—	—	—	—	—	—	—		Ruby
"Filter"	2025	— (Note: "Filter" did not enter the Circle Digital Chart, but peaked at number 73 on the Circle Download Chart.)	—	—	—	—	—	—	—	—	—		Ruby
"Seoul City"	2025	— (Note: "Seoul City" did not enter the Circle Digital Chart, but peaked at number 72 on the Circle Download Chart.)	—	—	—	—	—	— (Note: "Seoul City" did not enter the Official Singapore Chart, but peaked at number 29 on the Regional Chart.)	—	—	—		Ruby
"Starlight"	2025	— (Note: "Starlight" did not enter the Circle Digital Chart, but peaked at number 67 on the Circle Download Chart.)	—	—	—	—	—	—	—	—	—		Ruby
"Twin"	2025	124	—	—	—	—	—	— (Note: "Twin" did not enter the Official Singapore Chart, but peaked at number 26 on the Regional Chart.)	—	—	—		Ruby
"Like Jennie" (extended remix) (with Diplo and D00mscrvll)	2026	— (Note: "Like Jennie" (extended remix) did not enter the Circle Digital Chart, but peaked at number 125 on the Circle Download Chart.)	—	—	—	—	—	—	—	—	—		Ruby (The Complete Collection)
"Heaven"	2026	163	—	16	—	7	—	— (Note: "Heaven" did not enter the Official Singapore Chart, but peaked at number 8 on the Regional Chart.)	7	—	— (Note: "Heaven" did not enter the Billboard Global 200, but peaked at number 182 on the Billboard Global Excl. US.)		Fallen Angel
"—" denotes releases that did not chart or were not released in that region.

== Songwriting credits ==
All song credits are adapted from the Korea Music Copyright Association's database unless otherwise noted.

Key
†	Indicates a production credit

List of songs, with year released, artist name, and album name
Year	Song	Artist	Album	Lyricist		Composer	
Year	Song	Artist	Album	Credited	With	Credited	With
2020	"Lovesick Girls"	Blackpink	The Album	Yes	Løren, Danny Chung, Jisoo, Teddy	Yes	R. Tee, 24, Teddy, Brian Lee, Leah Haywood, David Guetta
2021	"Solo" (remix)	Jennie	Blackpink 2021 'The Show' Live	Yes	24, Teddy	Yes	24, Teddy
2023	"The Girls"	Blackpink	Non-album single	Yes	Danny Chung, Madison Love, Melanie Fontana, Michel Schulz, Rosé, Ryan Tedder	Yes	Danny Chung, Madison Love, Melanie Fontana, Michel Schulz, Rosé, Ryan Tedder
2024	"Slow Motion"	Matt Champion and Jennie	Mika's Laundry	Yes	Adam Feeney, Dijon Duenas, Henry Kwapis, Jacob Reske, Matt Champion, Romil Hemnani	Yes	Adam Feeney, Dijon Duenas, Henry Kwapis, Jacob Reske, Matt Champion, Romil Hemnani
2024	"Mantra"	Jennie	Ruby	Yes	Billy Walsh, Claudia Valentina, Elle Campbell, Isabelle Carlsson, Jelli Dorman, Leonard Oestman, Serban Kazan	Yes	Billy Walsh, Claudia Valentina, Elle Campbell, Isabelle Carlsson, Jelli Dorman, Leonard Oestman, Serban Kazan
2025	"Love Hangover"†	Jennie & Dominic Fike	Ruby	No	N/A	No	N/A
2025	"ExtraL"	Jennie & Doechii	Ruby	Yes	Jaylah Hickmon, Dwayne Abernathy Jr., Alexis Andrea Boyd, Sorana Pacurar	Yes	Jaylah Hickmon, Dwayne Abernathy Jr., Alexis Andrea Boyd, Sorana Pacurar
2025	"Intro: Jane"	Jennie & FKJ	Ruby	Yes	Vincent Fenton	Yes	Vincent Fenton
2025	"Like Jennie"	Jennie	Ruby	Yes	Tayla Parx, Amanda "Kiddo A.I." Ibanez, Zico, Thomas Pentz, Jorge Alfonso Sr.	Yes	Tayla Parx, Amanda "Kiddo A.I." Ibanez, Zico, Thomas Pentz, Jorge Alfonso Sr.
2025	"With the IE (Way Up)"	Jennie	Ruby	Yes	Dwayne Abernathy Jr., Jelli Dorman, Jose Fernando Arbex Miro	Yes	Dwayne Abernathy Jr., Jelli Dorman, Jose Fernando Arbex Miro
2025	"Zen"	Jennie	Ruby	Yes	Jelli Dorman, Asheton Hogan, Bibi Bourelly, Kirsten Spencer	Yes	Jelli Dorman, Asheton Hogan, Bibi Bourelly, Kirsten Spencer
2025	"Damn Right"	Jennie, Childish Gambino & Kali Uchis	Ruby	Yes	Donald Glover, Karly-Marina Loaiza, Jean Day Jr., Samuel Gloade, Michael Williams II, Bibi Bourelly, Ariowa Irosogie	Yes	Donald Glover, Karly-Marina Loaiza, Jean Day Jr., Samuel Gloade, Michael Williams II, Bibi Bourelly, Ariowa Irosogie
2025	"F.T.S."	Jennie	Ruby	Yes	Asheton Hogan, Bibi Bourelly, Carly Gibert, Cristopher Newlin	Yes	Asheton Hogan, Bibi Bourelly, Carly Gibert, Cristopher Newlin
2025	"Filter"†	Jennie	Ruby	Yes	Alexis Andrea Boyd, Sorana Pacurar, Dwayne Abernathy Jr., Carmen Reece	Yes	Alexis Andrea Boyd, Sorana Pacurar, Dwayne Abernathy Jr., Carmen Reece
2025	"Seoul City"	Jennie	Ruby	Yes	Myles Harris, Braylin Bowman, Xeryus Gittens, Michael Williams II, Bibi Bourelly, Carly Gibert	Yes	Myles Harris, Braylin Bowman, Xeryus Gittens, Michael Williams II, Bibi Bourelly, Carly Gibert
2025	"Starlight"	Jennie	Ruby	Yes	Asheton Hogan, Armel Potter, Michael Williams II, Bibi Bourelly, Ariowa Irosogie	Yes	Asheton Hogan, Armel Potter, Michael Williams II, Bibi Bourelly, Ariowa Irosogie
2025	"Twin"	Jennie	Ruby	Yes	Bibi Bourelly, Christopher Newlin, Michael Williams II	Yes	Bibi Bourelly, Christopher Newlin, Michael Williams II
2026	"Dracula" (Remix)	Tame Impala and Jennie	Non-album single	Yes	Kevin Parker, Sarah Aarons, Carly Gibert	Yes	Kevin Parker, Sarah Aarons, Carly Gibert
2026	"Go"	Blackpink	Deadline	Yes	Rosé, Jisoo, Lisa, Chris Martin, Henry Walter, Danny Chung	No	N/A
2026	"Fallen Angel"	Jennie	Fallen Angel	Yes	Daniel Aged, Deborah Jung, Romil Hemnani, Saya Gray, Jelli Dorman	Yes	Daniel Aged, Deborah Jung, Romil Hemnani, Saya Gray, Jelli Dorman
2026	"Heaven"	Jennie	Fallen Angel	Yes	Dave Hamelin, Tyler Spry, Mark Williams, Raul Cubina, James Essein, Jelli Dorman	Yes	Dave Hamelin, Tyler Spry, Mark Williams, Raul Cubina, James Essein, Jelli Dorman
2026	"Less Than a Lover"	Jennie	Fallen Angel	Yes	Tyler Spry, Magnus Høiberg, Deborah Jung, Bibi Bourelly, Jelli Dorman	Yes	Tyler Spry, Magnus Høiberg, Deborah Jung, Bibi Bourelly, Jelli Dorman
2026	"Sweettooth"	Jennie	Fallen Angel	Yes	Tyler Spry, Sam Homaee, Finn Keane, Jonathan Bach, Jelli Dorman, Bibi Bourelly, Alexis Kesselman	Yes	Tyler Spry, Sam Homaee, Finn Keane, Jonathan Bach, Jelli Dorman, Bibi Bourelly, Alexis Kesselman
2026	"Lockitdown"	Jennie	Fallen Angel	Yes	Tyler Spry, Jelli Dorman, Bibi Bourelly	Yes	Tyler Spry, Jelli Dorman, Bibi Bourelly
2026	"Face"	Jennie	Fallen Angel	Yes	Daniel Aged, Jelli Dorman, Saya Gray, Livvi Franc	Yes	Daniel Aged, Jelli Dorman, Saya Gray, Livvi Franc
2026	"Power Trip"	Jennie	Grand Theft Auto VI: The Album	Yes	Alexander Guy Cook, Bibi Bourelly, Corey Lindsey-Keay	Yes	Alexander Guy Cook, Bibi Bourelly, Corey Lindsey-Keay

== Music videos ==
=== As lead artist ===
Title	Year	Director(s)	Length	Ref.
"Solo"	2018	Han Sa-min	2:56	
"One of the Girls" (with the Weeknd and Lily-Rose Depp)	2023	Sam Levinson	4:18	
"Mantra"	2024	Tanu Muino	2:28	
"Zen"	2025	Cho Gi-seok	3:31	
"Love Hangover" (featuring Dominic Fike)	2025	Bradley & Pablo	3:37	
"ExtraL" (featuring Doechii)	2025	Cole Bennett	3:40	
"Like Jennie"	2025	Lee Han-gyeol	3:02	
"Handlebars" (featuring Dua Lipa)	2025	BRTHR	3:31	
"Seoul City"	2025	Dasom Han	2:45	
"Less Than a Lover"	2026	Choeey	3:38	
"Fallen Angel"	2026	Sunburnkids	5:42	
"Someone to Hold"	2026	Alyce Tzue and John Ripa	3:40	

=== As featured artist ===
Title	Year	Director(s)	Length	Ref.
"Spot!" (Zico featuring Jennie)	2024	Choi Yong-seok and Ro Ran (Lumpens)	3:12	

=== Other videos ===
Title	Year	Director(s)	Length	Ref.
"You & Me" (dance performance video)	2023	Lee Han-gyeol	3:31	

== See also ==
- Blackpink discography
- List of artists who reached number one on the Billboard Adult Top 40
- List of artists who reached number one on the Hot Dance/Electronic Songs
- List of artists who reached number one on the UK Singles Downloads Chart
- List of artists who reached number one on the U.S. Pop Airplay chart
- List of K-pop on the Billboard charts
