= Love Hangover (disambiguation) =

"Love Hangover" is a 1976 song by Diana Ross.

Love Hangover may also refer to:

- "Love Hangover" (Jennie song), a 2025 song by Jennie
- "Love Hangover", a song by Jason Derulo from the 2010 album Jason Derulo
