= ExtraL =

Single by Jennie featuring Doechii

from the album Ruby
- Released: February 21, 2025
- Studio: Chalice Recording (Los Angeles)
- Genre: Hip-hop
- Length: 2:48
- Label: Odd Atelier; Columbia
- Songwriters: Jennie; Jaylah Hickmon; Alexis Andrea Boyd; Sorana Păcurar; Dwayne Abernathy Jr.
- Producer: Dem Jointz

Jennie singles chronology
"Love Hangover" (2025)	"ExtraL" (2025)	"Like Jennie" (2025)

Doechii singles chronology
"Nosebleeds" (2025)	"ExtraL" (2025)	"Anxiety" (2025)

Music video
- "ExtraL" on YouTube

"ExtraL" is a song by South Korean singer and rapper Jennie featuring American rapper Doechii. It was released through Odd Atelier and Columbia Records on February 21, 2025, as the third single from her debut studio album, Ruby (2025). The song was written by Jennie and Doechii with Alexis Andrea Boyd, Sorana Păcurar, and its producer Dem Jointz. Described as a female empowerment anthem, the hip-hop track features rapid-fire raps from the duo celebrating their success as women in the industry.

Critics positively reviewed "ExtraL" for its dynamic production and the artists' versatile delivery, with particular praise towards Doechii's rap verse. The song peaked inside the top twenty of the Billboard Global 200, reaching number 18. It reached the top ten in Malaysia, Singapore, Taiwan, and Vietnam and peaked at number 42 on South Korea's Circle Digital Chart. In the United States, it became Jennie's fourth and highest-charting entry on the Billboard Hot 100 at number 75 and was certified gold by the Recording Industry Association of America (RIAA), making her the first K-pop solo artist with four RIAA certifications.

An accompanying music video was directed by Cole Bennett and released on Jennie's YouTube channel simultaneously with the single's release, depicting the artists rapping and performing choreography together. "ExtraL" was performed by Jennie on the Ruby Experience tour, the Coachella Valley Music and Arts Festival, and Blackpink's Deadline World Tour, and by Doechii on the Live from the Swamp Tour. The song received nominations for Best Collaboration and Song of the Year at the 2025 MAMA Awards.

== Background and release ==
After departing from YG Entertainment for solo activities, Jennie founded her own record label named Odd Atelier in November 2023. She proceeded to sign as a solo artist with Columbia Records in partnership with Odd Atelier in September 2024. Jennie released "Mantra" in October 2024 and "Love Hangover" in January 2025 through Odd Atelier and Columbia Records as the first two singles from her debut studio album, Ruby. Meanwhile, rising American rapper Doechii won the Grammy Award for Best Rap Album and earned her first solo Billboard Hot 100 hit with the viral song "Denial Is a River" in 2025.

Speculation of a collaboration between Jennie and Doechii first sparked when the duo posed together backstage at Camp Flog Gnaw Carnival in November 2024. Jennie shared on Hits Radio that she was "manifesting it for the longest time" but it took time to coordinate together for a collaboration to work out. On January 21, 2025, she confirmed Doechii's appearance as one of the featured artists on Ruby. Jennie shared a 10-second snippet of a new song called "ExtraL" featuring Doechii to her social media channels on February 14. With the snippet, she announced that it would be released as the album's third single on February 21.

== Composition and lyrics ==
Produced by Dem Jointz, "ExtraL" highlights both artists' dynamic delivery over a "slick, hip-hop-infused beat" and blends Jennie's signature pop sound with Doechii's hip-hop. The production features "stuttering hi-hats, aggressive bass, and a distorted vocal loop" that repeats in the background to give the song a "chaotic energy." The song's lyrics have been described as an anthem for female empowerment. Jennie and Doechii use the song to celebrate their success and rap about trading men and worries for funds and fast cars. The two artists take turns on different verses before uniting on the track’s "confidence-boosting" chorus, in which they chant "Do my ladies run this?"

Jennie opens with a verse shouting out self-made women with financial independence in the line "This for my girls with no sponsor, they got they own fundin'", which alludes to her founding her own label Odd Atelier. Her rap includes the cheeky lyric "You sit too far down on 'em charts to even ask me who’s in charge", referencing her history of topping Billboard charts both with her group Blackpink and as a soloist. She additionally raps about playing by her own rules and not listening to people who aren't making moves for themselves before sliding into a trap-influenced chorus. Following the chorus, stacked gang vocals repeat the question "Do my ladies run this?" as Doechii enters the song singing her own name. She begins her verse rapping "Gimme chi, gimme purr, gimme meow, gimme her, gimme funds / Gimme rights, gimme fight, gimme nerve, gimme cunt, let me serve, rrr", describing femme fatale energy by likening women to felines. She goes on to announce that she doesn't make any decisions with men in mind and if that makes her seem "misbehaved", so be it. Jennie and Doechii then rap together about how far they've come and how people are "still on my old work", locked into their previous personas and music releases despite their growth. They also clarify that they've earned their success through hard work and are reaping the benefits.

== Critical reception ==
In his ranking for Billboard, Jeff Benjamin placed "ExtraL" as the second-best song on Ruby, describing it as a "dynamic collaboration showcasing two of pop’s most exciting artists in a peak of creative synergy" and a female empowerment anthem that avoids falling into cliches. He commended their "rapid shifts between rapping, belting, chanting and empowering battle cries with artists sounding equally excited to be on record together and delivering their best", as well as the cleverly-written verses that embrace their respective unique identities and require multiple listens to catch the full meaning. Maria Letícia L. Gomes of Clash lauded the track for the tight production, Doechii's "electric" high-speed verse, and Jennie's sharp alternations between "playful taunts and rapid-fire rap", finding that she thrived with a "perfectly fitting partner". AllMusic's David Crone praised the song's "roof-raising chants" and "bold showings from Doechii", while the Associated Press's Maria Sherman described her as "innovative" with her "acicular raps". Jon Caramanica of The New York Times surmised that Doechii "flatly and flamboyantly outraps" Jennie. Similarly, Pitchfork's Joshua Minsoo Kim felt that Jennie lacked Doechii's conviction, though he argued that the song's "sleek synths, beat switches, and chanted vocals" made up for it and was enough to keep the listener invested.

== Accolades ==
Awards and nominations
Year	Organization	Award	Result	Ref.
2025	MAMA Awards	Best Collaboration	Nominated	
2025	MAMA Awards	Song of the Year	Nominated	
2026	iHeartRadio Music Awards	Favorite K-pop Collab	Nominated	
2026	Music Awards Japan	Best International Hip Hop/Rap Song in Japan	Nominated	
2026	Music Awards Japan	Best of Listeners' Choice: International Song	Nominated	

== Commercial performance ==
"ExtraL" debuted at number 18 on the Billboard Global 200 and number 13 on the Global Excl. US. In the United States, the song debuted at number 75 on the Billboard Hot 100, marking a personal high for Jennie on the chart. It marked the third consecutive single from Ruby to chart on the Hot 100, following "Mantra" at number 98 and "Love Hangover" at number 96. Following the album's release in March, "ExtraL" re-entered the Hot 100 at number 99 and charted simultaneously with "Like Jennie" and "Handlebars". This made Jennie the first K-pop female soloist to have three songs on the chart in the same week, as well as the K-pop female soloist with the most total entries on the chart (six). "ExraL" was certified gold by the Recording Industry Association of America (RIAA) in December, making Jennie the first K-pop solo artist with four RIAA certifications.

== Music video ==
An accompanying music video for "ExtraL" was directed by Cole Bennett and released alongside the single on Jennie's YouTube channel on February 21. The video sees Jennie dancing around a chair-filled theater, before she and her dancers give Doechii a grand entrance chanting, "Wait... wait... wait... Doechii?!" as she appears. The duo then dance alongside a crew of dancers while wearing oversized Schiaparelli blazers and fiery red feather boa trimmed bodysuits. In one scene, they are depicted extra-small rapping on top of a bald man's head. The music video surpassed 100 million views in November, marking Jennie's fourth music video to reach the milestone following "Solo" (2018), "Mantra", and "Like Jennie".

== Live performances ==
Jennie included "ExtraL" on the setlist of her concert tour the Ruby Experience, which commenced in Los Angeles on March 6, 2025 at the same time as Ruby's release. She also performed the song at the Coachella Valley Music and Arts Festival on April 13 and 20. Doechii included "ExtraL" on the setlist of her Live from the Swamp Tour, which started in Chicago on October 15. In 2026, Jennie included the song in her headlining festival sets at ComplexCon Hong Kong on March 22, Governors Ball Music Festival on June 7, Roskilde Festival on July 3, Open'er Festival on July 4, Mad Cool on July 10, and Lollapalooza on August 1.

== Usage in media ==
ExtraL is one of the featured songs in the soundtrack of the video game WWE 2K26.

== Credits and personnel ==
Credits adapted from the liner notes of Ruby and Tidal.

Recording

- Recorded and engineered at Chalice Recording Studios (Los Angeles, California)
- Mixed at Larrabee Studios (North Hollywood, California)
- Mastered at Sterling Sound (Edgewater, New Jersey)

Personnel

- Jennie – vocals, songwriter
- Doechii – featured vocals, songwriter (Doechii version)
- Alexis Andrea Boyd – songwriter
- Sorana Păcurar – songwriter
- Dem Jointz – songwriter, producer, recording engineer, vocal producer
- Jadya Love – recording engineer (Doechii version)
- Jennifer Ortiz – engineer (Doechii version)
- Chris O'Ryan – vocal producer, vocal engineer (Doechii version)
- Manny Marroquin – mix engineer
- Serban Ghenea – mix engineer (Doechii version)
- Anthony Vilchis – assistant mix engineer
- Trey Station – assistant mix engineer
- Bryce Bordone – assistant mix engineer (Doechii version)
- Will Quinnell – mastering engineer
- Chris Gehringer – mastering engineer (Doechii version)

== Charts ==
=== Weekly charts ===
Weekly chart performance
Chart (2025)	Peak position
Australia (ARIA)	64
Australia Hip Hop/R&B (ARIA)	11
Brazil Hot 100 (Billboard)	78
Canada Hot 100 (Billboard)	58
China (TME Korean)	7
France (SNEP)	94
Global 200 (Billboard)	18
Greece International (IFPI)	37
Hong Kong (Billboard)	13
Ireland (IRMA)	74
Malaysia (IFPI)	9
New Zealand Hot Singles (RMNZ)	5
Nigeria (TurnTable Top 100)	58
Philippines (Philippines Hot 100)	19
Portugal (AFP)	71
Singapore (RIAS)	8
South Korea (Circle)	42
Taiwan (Billboard)	8
Thailand (IFPI)	17
UK Singles (Official Charts)	37
US Billboard Hot 100	75
US Hot Dance/Pop Songs (Billboard)	6
Vietnam (IFPI)	8

=== Monthly charts ===
Monthly chart performance
Chart (2025)	Peak position
South Korea (Circle)	58

=== Year-end charts ===
Year-end chart performance
Chart (2025)	Position
US Hot Dance/Pop Songs (Billboard)	17

== Certifications ==
Certifications
Region	Certification	Certified units/sales
Brazil (Pro-Música Brasil)	2× Platinum	80,000^{‡}
United States (RIAA)	Gold	500,000^{‡}
^{‡} Sales+streaming figures based on certification alone.

== Release history ==
Release formats
Region	Date	Format	Label	Ref.
Various	February 21, 2025	Digital download; streaming	Odd Atelier; Columbia	
