= List of Billboard Global 200 top-ten singles in 2025 =

This is a list of singles that charted in the top ten of the Billboard Global 200, an all-genre singles chart, in 2025.

== Top-ten singles ==
An asterisk (*) represents that a single is in the top ten as of the issue dated for the week of September 5, 2026.

Key

- ↑ – indicates single's top 10 entry was also its Global 200 debut

List of Billboard Global 200 top ten singles that peaked in 2025
Top ten entry date	Single	Artist(s)	Peak	Peak date	Weeks in top ten	Ref.
Singles from 2024
December 7	"Luther"^{[B]}^{[C]}^{[E]}^{[L]} ↑	Kendrick Lamar and SZA	3	March 1	21	
Singles from 2025
January 11	"Messy"^{[H]}	Lola Young	5	January 18	11	
January 25	"DTMF"^{[K]}	Bad Bunny	1	January 25	16	
January 25	"Voy a Llevarte Pa' PR"	Bad Bunny	8	January 25	3	
January 25	"Veldá"	Bad Bunny, Omar Courtz and Dei V	9	January 25	1	
February 15	"Cry for Me" ↑	The Weeknd	7	February 15	1	
February 15	"Abracadabra"^{[I]}^{[J]} ↑	Lady Gaga	5	February 22	8	
February 22	"All the Stars"	Kendrick Lamar and SZA	6	March 1	3	
March 22	"Like Jennie" ↑	Jennie	5	March 22	11	
March 22	"Anxiety" ↑	Doechii	3	March 29	8	
March 29	"Evil J0rdan" ↑	Playboi Carti	4	March 29	1	
March 29	"Rather Lie" ↑	Playboi Carti and The Weeknd	6	March 29	1	
March 29	"The Giver" ↑	Chappell Roan	10	March 29	1	
April 5	"Ordinary"^{[Q]}	Alex Warren	1	May 10	61*	
April 12	"Twilight Zone" ↑	Ariana Grande	7	April 12	1	
April 19	"Nokia"	Drake	8	April 19	2	
May 10	"Show Me Love"	WizTheMc and Bees & Honey	10	May 10	2	
May 31	"What I Want" ↑	Morgan Wallen featuring Tate McRae	5	May 31	3	
May 31	"Don't Say You Love Me" ↑	Jin	6	June 7	2	
May 31	"Just in Case"	Morgan Wallen	9	May 31	1	
June 7	"Back to Friends"^{[N]}^{[R]}	Sombr	5	September 27	28	
June 14	"Shake It to the Max (Fly)"	Moliy, Silent Addy, Skillibeng and Shenseea	6	June 14	2	
June 14	"Just Keep Watching" ↑	Tate McRae	8	June 14	1	
June 21	"Manchild"^{[O]} ↑	Sabrina Carpenter	2	June 21	7	
June 21	"Sapphire" ↑	Ed Sheeran	8	June 21	2	
June 28	"Killin' It Girl" ↑	J-Hope featuring GloRilla	3	June 28	2	
June 28	"Love Me Not"	Ravyn Lenae	7	June 28	4	
July 12	"Golden"	Huntrix: Ejae, Audrey Nuna and Rei Ami	1	July 19	40	
July 12	"Dirty Work" ↑	Aespa	5	July 12	1	
July 12	"Your Idol"^{[R]}	Saja Boys: Andrew Choi, Neckwav, Danny Chung, Kevin Woo and Samuil Lee	3	July 19	15	
July 19	"Soda Pop"^{[R]}	Saja Boys: Andrew Choi, Neckwav, Danny Chung, Kevin Woo and Samuil Lee	3	August 9	17	
July 19	"What Did I Miss?" ↑	Drake	9	July 19	1	
July 26	"Jump" ↑	Blackpink	1	July 26	7	
July 26	"Daisies" ↑	Justin Bieber	3	July 26	8	
July 26	"How It's Done"	Huntrix: Ejae, Audrey Nuna and Rei Ami	5	August 23	12	
August 2	"Saiyaara" ↑	Faheem Abdullah	8	August 9	2	
August 16	"The Subway" ↑	Chappell Roan	3	August 16	2	
August 30	"What It Sounds Like"	Huntrix: Ejae, Audrey Nuna and Rei Ami	7	September 6	6	
September 6	"Ceremony" ↑	Stray Kids	10	September 6	1	
September 13	"Tears" ↑	Sabrina Carpenter	2	September 13	3	
September 13	"My Man on Willpower" ↑	Sabrina Carpenter	10	September 13	1	
October 4	"Iris Out"^{[S]}	Kenshi Yonezu	5	October 4	4	
October 11	"Tit for Tat" ↑	Tate McRae	6	October 11	1	
October 18	"The Fate of Ophelia" ↑	Taylor Swift	1	October 18	25	
October 18	"Opalite" ↑	Taylor Swift	2	October 18	10	
October 18	"Elizabeth Taylor" ↑	Taylor Swift	3	October 18	4	
October 18	"Father Figure" ↑	Taylor Swift	4	October 18	3	
October 18	"Wood" ↑	Taylor Swift	6	October 18	2	
October 18	"Wi$h Li$t" ↑	Taylor Swift	7	October 18	2	
October 18	"The Life of a Showgirl" ↑	Taylor Swift featuring Sabrina Carpenter	8	October 18	2	
October 18	"Cancelled!" ↑	Taylor Swift	9	October 18	1	
October 18	"Actually Romantic" ↑	Taylor Swift	10	October 18	2	
November 8	"Spaghetti" ↑	Le Sserafim and J-Hope	6	November 8	3	
November 22	"BZRP Music Sessions, Vol. 0/66" ↑	Bizarrap and Daddy Yankee	8	November 22	1	

=== 2024 peaks ===
List of Billboard Global 200 top ten singles in 2025 that peaked in 2024
Top ten entry date	Single	Artist(s)	Peak	Peak date	Weeks in top ten	Ref.
January 20	"Lose Control"^{[B]}^{[I]}^{[M]}	Teddy Swims	4	February 17	29	
February 10	"Beautiful Things"^{[B]}^{[F]}^{[G]}	Benson Boone	1	February 17	58	
April 27	"Espresso"^{[B]} ↑	Sabrina Carpenter	1	June 22	33	
May 18	"Not Like Us"^{[E]} ↑	Kendrick Lamar	1	May 18	22	
June 1	"Birds of a Feather"^{[B]} ↑	Billie Eilish	1	August 17	58	
August 3	"Who"^{[B]} ↑	Jimin	1	August 3	6	
August 31	"Die with a Smile"^{[O]}^{[T]} ↑	Lady Gaga and Bruno Mars	1	September 7	62	
October 12	"Timeless"^{[D]}^{[K]} ↑	The Weeknd and Playboi Carti	3	October 12	5	
November 2	"APT." ↑	Rosé and Bruno Mars	1	November 2	40	
November 16	"That's So True"^{[B]}^{[F]}^{[G]}	Gracie Abrams	4	November 23	16	
December 7	"TV Off"^{[E]} ↑	Kendrick Lamar featuring Lefty Gunplay	5	December 7	5	

=== 2026 peaks ===
List of Billboard Global 200 top ten singles in 2025 that peaked in 2026
Top ten entry date	Single	Artist(s)	Peak	Peak date	Weeks in top ten	Ref.
January 18	"Nuevayol" ↑	Bad Bunny	3	February 21	7	
January 18	"Baile Inolvidable" ↑	Bad Bunny	2	February 21	9	
February 1	"EOO"	Bad Bunny	4	February 21	3	
September 27	"Man I Need"^{[R]}	Olivia Dean	2	February 14	31*	
November 29	"Where Is My Husband!"	Raye	6	January 17	8	
November 29	"So Easy (To Fall in Love)"	Olivia Dean	7	January 17	11	

=== Holiday season ===
Recurring holiday titles, appearing in the Billboard Global 200 top ten in previous holiday seasons
Top ten entry date	Single	Artist(s)	Peak	Peak date	Weeks in top ten	Ref.
December 12, 2020	"All I Want for Christmas Is You"^{[U]}	Mariah Carey	1	December 19, 2020	33	
December 12, 2020	"Last Christmas"^{[V]}	Wham!	1	December 20, 2025	30	
December 12, 2020	"Rockin' Around the Christmas Tree"^{[V]}	Brenda Lee	2	December 24, 2022	27	
December 19, 2020	"Jingle Bell Rock"^{[W]}	Bobby Helms	4	January 2, 2021	26	
December 19, 2020	"It's Beginning to Look a Lot Like Christmas"^{[A]}^{[X]}	Michael Buble	6	January 2, 2021	14	
December 26, 2020	"Santa Tell Me"^{[W]}	Ariana Grande	5	January 2, 2021	20	
January 2, 2021	"Underneath the Tree"^{[W]}	Kelly Clarkson	6	December 30, 2023	11	
December 30, 2023	"Let It Snow! Let It Snow! Let It Snow!"^{[A]}^{[Y]}	Dean Martin	6	January 6, 2024	4	

== Notes ==
^{A} The single re-entered the top ten on the week ending January 4, 2025.
^{B} The single re-entered the top ten on the week ending January 11, 2025.
^{C} The single re-entered the top ten on the week ending February 8, 2025.
^{D} The single re-entered the top ten on the week ending February 15, 2025.
^{E} The single re-entered the top ten on the week ending February 22, 2025.
^{F} The single re-entered the top ten on the week ending March 15, 2025.
^{G} The single re-entered the top ten on the week ending April 5, 2025.
^{H} The single re-entered the top ten on the week ending April 26, 2025.
^{I} The single re-entered the top ten on the week ending May 3, 2025.
^{J} The single re-entered the top ten on the week ending May 17, 2025.
^{K} The single re-entered the top ten on the week ending May 24, 2025.
^{L} The single re-entered the top ten on the week ending June 7, 2025.
^{M} The single re-entered the top ten on the week ending July 5, 2025.
^{N} The single re-entered the top ten on the week ending August 9, 2025.
^{O} The single re-entered the top ten on the week ending September 13, 2025.
^{P} The single re-entered the top ten on the week ending September 20, 2025.
^{Q} The single re-entered the top ten on the week ending October 25, 2025.
^{R} The single re-entered the top ten on the week ending November 1, 2025.
^{S} The single re-entered the top ten on the week ending November 8, 2025.
^{T} The single re-entered the top ten on the week ending November 15, 2025.
^{U} The single re-entered the top ten on the week ending November 29, 2025.
^{V} The single re-entered the top ten on the week ending December 6, 2025.
^{W} The single re-entered the top ten on the week ending December 13, 2025.
^{X} The single re-entered the top ten on the week ending December 20, 2025.
^{Y} The single re-entered the top ten on the week ending December 27, 2025.
