= Cho Gi-seok =

South Korean photographer (born 1992)

Cho Gi-seok (Korean: 조기석; born 1992) is a South Korean photographer and founder of KUSIKOHC, a streetwear brand. His brand has released several seasonal collections since its inception of 2016 and was also a semi-finalist for the LVMH Prize in 2023. His photography has appeared in magazines like Vogue and Kinfolk, depicted celebrities like Billie Eilish and the members of Le Sserafim, and been included in seasonal collections by fashion brands like Gucci and Bulgari. Once showcased at the Fotografiska New York in 2021–2022, Cho is known by critics for his incorporation of surrealism into his photography, as well as his frequent motifs of clashing opposites.

The World Photography Organisation listed Cho among "The 11 photographers who will expand your creativity" in 2019. British Journal of Photography included Cho in its "Ones to Watch" series in 2020. In 2021, British Vogue called Cho a must-follow visionary East Asian photographer. In the same year, Dazed and Converse included Cho in their Dazed 100 roster of "people shaping youth culture globally." In 2022, Business of Fashion named Cho in the BoF 500, a list of people shaping fashion worldwide.

== Early life ==
Cho was born in Seoul in 1992.

From a young age, Cho was always interested in art, specifically drawing. He attended college for graphic design but later dropped out.

== Career ==
=== Art director ===
Cho began his career in the arts by working as an art director, a graphic designer, and a set designer. Often pivoting between different forms, Cho believed that working in several mediums would best actualize his art practice:

... I thought that I could become a better art director if I could do all the fields. So with graphic design, I liked making things by hand, so then I also began to explore set design. After that, I started to work as an art director, and then I started taking pictures naturally, because I wanted to create my own images, and I wanted to work through all these processes.

=== Fashion ===
In 2016, Cho launched his streetwear brand, KUSIKOHC, which has since released several collections of apparel and accessories specifically designed with a surrealist sensibility. After taking photography himself for KUSIKOHC's look book, "began to figure out what images I wanted to capture and became more interested in photography." Although Cho still serves as a creative director for KUSIKOHC, he has since pivoted to full-time photography.

After a brief hiatus lasting several years, KUSIKOHC returned with a spring/summer collection in 2022. In 2023, Cho was one of 22 semi-finalists for the annual LVMH Prize; he had entered the prize's running on behalf of KUSIKOHC.

=== Photography ===
Cho's photographs have appeared in Dazed, Kinfolk, Rain, Vogue, Vogue Italia, Elle Korea, Esquire Korea, Wallpaper Korea, Dazed China, Numéro, FEMALE, and others. His subjects have included Rain, Veronica Yoko Plebani, and others. Cho has also photographed for and/or collaborated with brands like Gucci, Bulgari, Solid Homme, Adidas, Cartier, CR Fashion, Prada, Converse, IISE, and several seasons of Songzio.

In 2020, Cho shot the music video for CL's "Post Up" music video. In 2021–2022, Cho's photographs from 2018–2020 were on display at Fotografiska New York with "Coexistence" being the name of his exhibit.

In 2023, Cho's photographs of British model Naomi Campbell with styling by Eunyoung Sohn was featured on the front page of Vogue Korea. In the same year, Cho photographed Korean girl group LE SSERAFIM ahead of their promotions for Unforgiven; he briefly drew controversy for not posting Sakura Miyawaki's photographs on his Instagram account despite including shots of the other four members, causing him to delete his post. Cho also took photos of and handled a music video for American singer-songwriter Kali Uchis. In September, Cho's photograph of Billie Eilish was printed on the cover of Allure. Additionally, he shot teaser pictures for the Red Velvet comeback Chill Kill, as well as group pictures of (G)I-dle in collaboration with 88rising.

In 2024, Cho handled the music video for XG's "Woke Up" music video. One year later, in 2025, Cho directed the music video for Jennie's "Zen", a song from her debut solo album, Ruby.

In 2026, Cho directed the music video for Grimes' "ACCELERANDO".

== Artistry ==
Cho has identified surrealism as an inspiration for some of his photography; he has also repeatedly pinpointed "the harmony of opposites" and "coexistence" as crucial ideas of his work.

In the British Journal of Photography, Cho stated that the "fundamental beauty" of the human form was among his interests. Additionally, he has sought unconventional, out-of-the-box ways of rendering and articulating Korean culture and identity—as well as Asian heritage, broadly speaking—especially in the context of the internet generation.

Cho also once led a photoshoot inspired by The Matrix series.

== Critical reception ==
In 2021, L'Officiel stated that Cho was "at the forefront of emerging talent in South Korea" and observed the "polished yet raw style" in his photography. In the same year, I-D wrote: "Ask anyone in the know for a list of rising stars in the Korean fashion scene and they’ll mention Cho Gi-seok. With over 300k people—including magazine editors, stylists, celebrities, and luxury brand designers—currently following the photographer's every move on Instagram, it is clear that his reach extends way beyond Korean borders."

Creative Review said that "Giseok's strength comes from his ability to effortlessly synthesise opposing forces, tradition and modernity, growth and destruction, and vulnerability and joy. His photographs conjure both the intimacy of Ren Hang and the performative energy of Floria Sigismondi, all through an ornate hybrid of art and fashion."

British Journal of Photography, which called Cho a photographer to watch in 2020, observed, in his work, "a sense of surrealness that permeates the dynamic portraits... In every carefully constructed image, the colours, lighting and props transform the model into a fantastical character, oozing with narrative and spirit."

In remarking on his Vogue Italia photographs of athlete Veronica Yoko Plebani, Vogue stated that Cho "works with infinite care, and hardly ever throws anything away: everything he looks at, no matter if it's on Instagram or in one of his beloved flea markets, can become the foundation on which to build a world, which always starts with a sketch and is realized between props and sets designed ad hoc."

Regarding his Fotografiska New York exhibit, Artsy remarked that "It’s difficult to discern whether the failure to cohere the works into a compelling exhibition lies in a curatorial shortcoming, or if the artist’s steadfast pursuit of beautiful images lacks broader resonance. But here’s hoping that, given Cho’s exquisite eye, he finds more meaningful ways to apply it in the future."
