= The Ruby Experience =

2025 concert tour by Jennie

- Tour by Jennie
- Promotional poster
- Location: South Korea; France; United States
- Associated album: Ruby
- Start date: March 6, 2025
- End date: March 21, 2025
- No. of shows: 5

The Ruby Experience was the first concert tour by South Korean singer and rapper Jennie in support of her debut studio album Ruby. The tour began on March 6, 2025, in Los Angeles, United States and concluded on March 21, 2025, at Le Zénith in Paris, France.

== Background ==
Jennie departed from YG Entertainment for solo activities and established her own record label named Odd Atelier in November 2023. She signed with Columbia Records in partnership with Odd Atelier in September 2024. On January 21, 2025, the singer officially announced her debut studio album Ruby to be released on March 7 through Odd Atelier and Columbia Records. Three days later, Jennie revealed that she would embark on a three-city run of concerts in promotion of the album. In her caption, she described the set of shows as "intense and intimate as I like it."

Billed as the Ruby Experience, the short tour was promoted by AEG Presents and sponsored by Spotify. It was originally announced as a three-show series starting in Los Angeles on March 6, followed by New York on March 10 and concluding in Seoul on March 15. A portion of proceeds from the shows supported fire recovery efforts and local firefighters in Los Angeles, which was devastated by wildfires in January. The mini-tour later scheduled two additional shows in Los Angeles on March 7 and Paris on March 21.

== Concert synopsis ==
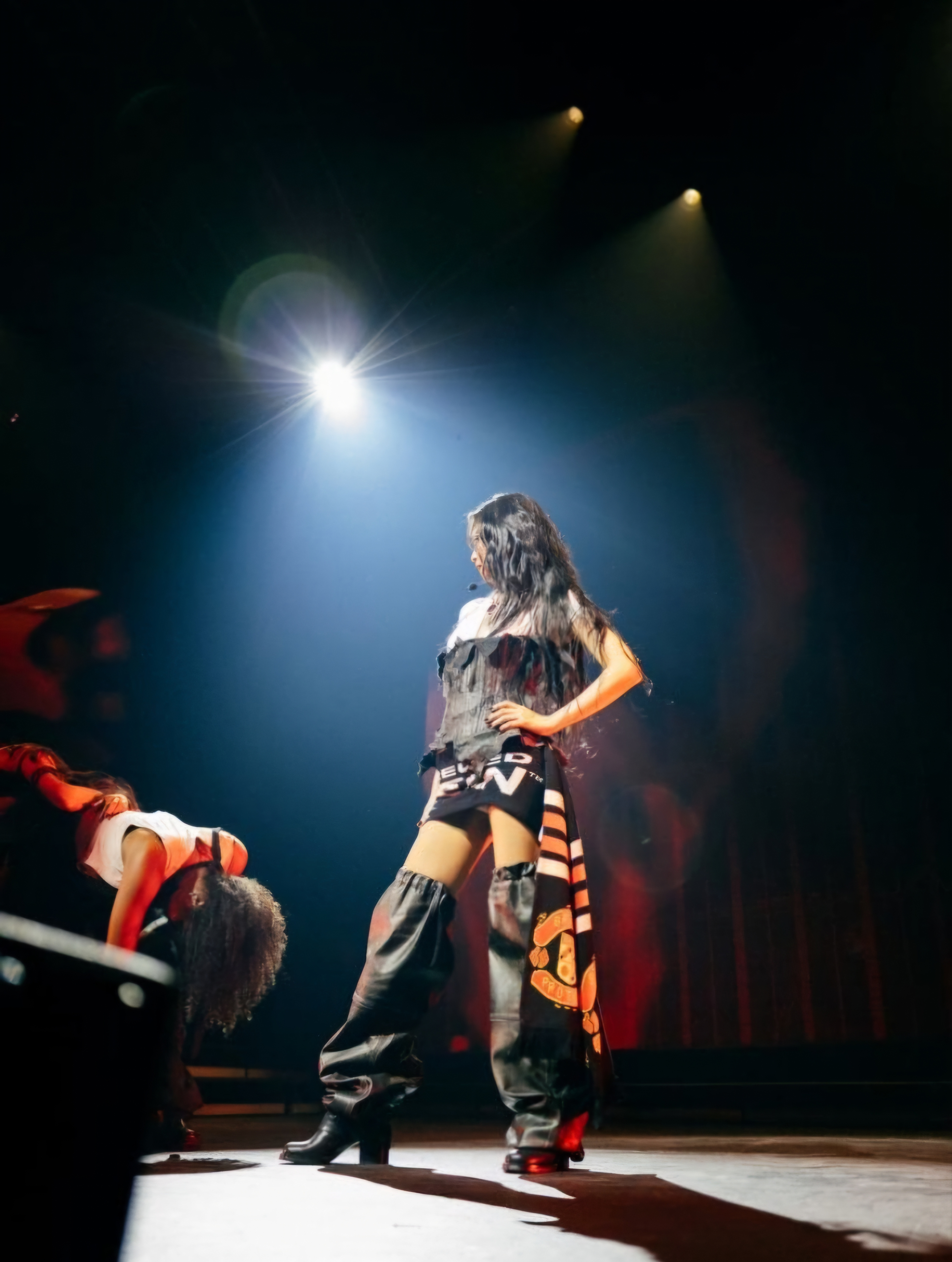
Jennie performing in Incheon

The show begins with red curtains that pull back to reveal the stage, including floor-to-ceiling LED screens and a full live band. Initially, a ballerina leaps across the stage as "Intro: Jane" plays, making the stage appear like a giant music box. The set then shifts to show Jennie at center stage in an oversized fur coat singing "Start a War" as she looks at herself in a mirror. The singer then performs "Handlebars" with the ground surrounding her transforming into a web-like structure, which is followed by a transition segment and dance break. Jennie takes the stage again for "Mantra", which she performs alongside 10 backup dancers with choreography by Charm La'Donna, who also worked on Kendrick Lamar's Super Bowl halftime show. After a quick outfit change, she jumps into a skit-like performance of "Love Hangover" that shows off her cheeky and playful side, followed by "Zen" and "Damn Right".

While Jennie completes another costume change, the music video for "Seoul City" is displayed to fans for the first time on screen. She and her dancers subsequently perform "Like Jennie", which seamlessly transitions into "With the IE (Way Up)". Jennie sings "ExtraL" and then takes a break to personally address the audience before jumping into emotional performances of "F.T.S." and "Filter". She heads backstage for a quick outfit change and returns on stage at a piano for "Starlight". As she performs the song, she runs across the stage making hearts and blowing kisses to fans while confetti fills the stage. Finally, Jennie closes the show with a stripped-down performance of "Twin" as the screen showcases a sunset by the beach.

== Reception ==
The Ruby Experience received positive reviews from critics. In her review of the Los Angeles concert, Nicole Fell of The Hollywood Reporter praised Jennie for showing her range and giving fans the chance to see a new side of her by playing all songs from her album Ruby with its array of tempos and genres. Fell also commended the show's "experimental and cinematic production" featuring "well-produced video segments and stage design and setup" that immersed the audience into the artist's vision, as well as Jennie's stylish outfits that made "each song feel like it had its own unique look." Variety's Thania Garcia described the same concert positively as a "sweet and sultry intro to her solo era", noting the contrast of Jennie's "sugary sweet yet rugged and sexy" performance. Kristine Kwak of Rolling Stone highlighted the fashion, live band, choreography, cinematic production, and Jennie's raw emotions as highlights of the set.

Writing for Forbes, Jeff Benjamin characterized the New York City show as a "generous offering of Jennie’s musical mind and a genuinely personal pop performance" with an "additional element of storytelling and intimacy that typically wouldn’t fit in a K-pop stadium show". Benjamin further opined that the show and its "top-notch technology and visuals" could easily be translated to an arena setting with a more expanded, slower-paced setlist. Korea JoongAng Daily's Woo Ji-won called the singer's concert in Seoul a "night filled with raw emotion and artistic brilliance" and expressed that Jennie had delivered an "emotional and intimate performance for fans". In his review of the same concert for Billboard Philippines, Gabriel Saulog pointed out Jennie's "intention and meticulous attention to detail ingrained with every performance" and defined the show as a "celebration of her freedom as an artist, and also a demonstration of the immense power that she’s capable of as a solo musician." Noting that it "felt like more than your usual K-pop concert", Saulog commended the exploration of various genres as a "perfect sampler (and introduction) of what she can do on her own" and felt that the concert presented Jennie in a "brand new (and authentic) light, welcoming the world to witness a new era of her artistry."

=== Accolades ===
The Ruby Experience was nominated for the Concert Category Grand Prize at the 12th Edaily Culture Awards.

== Set list ==
This setlist was taken from the March 6, 2025 concert in Los Angeles.

1. "Intro: Jane"
2. "Start a War"
3. "Handlebars"
4. "Mantra"
5. "Love Hangover"
6. "Zen"
7. "Damn Right"
8. "Seoul City"
9. "Like Jennie"
10. "With the IE (Way Up)"
11. "ExtraL"
12. "F.T.S."
13. "Filter"
14. "Starlight"
15. "Twin"

== Tour dates ==
List of 2025 concerts
Date	City	Country	Venue	Attendance	Revenue
March 6, 2025	Los Angeles	United States	Peacock Theater	—	—
March 7, 2025	Los Angeles	United States	Peacock Theater	—	—
March 10, 2025	New York	United States	Radio City Music Hall	5,798	$1,580,145
March 15, 2025	Incheon (Note: Labelled as Seoul in promotional material.)	South Korea	Inspire Arena	10,000	—
March 21, 2025	Paris	France	Le Zénith	—	—
Total				—	—
