= Zen (Jennie song) =

Song by Jennie

from the album Ruby
- Released: March 7, 2025
- Studio: Paradise Sound Recordings (Los Angeles)
- Genre: Industrial
- Length: 3:21
- Label: Odd Atelier; Columbia
- Songwriters: Jennie; Asheton Hogan; Badriia "Bibi" Bourelly; Kirsten Alyssa Spencer; Jelli Dorman
- Producer: Pluss

Music video
- "Zen" on YouTube

"Zen" is a song by South Korean singer and rapper Jennie. Its music video was directed by Cho Gi-seok and released through Odd Atelier and Columbia Records on January 25, 2025. The song was later officially released on digital and streaming platforms on March 7 as a track on Jennie's debut studio album, Ruby (2025).

== Background and release ==
On January 21, 2025, Jennie officially announced the title of her forthcoming debut solo album, Ruby, and its release date of March 7, 2025. Hours after announcing a three-city run of concerts titled the Ruby Experience on January 25, she surprise released the music video for an upcoming song on the album titled "Zen". The song was subsequently released on digital and streaming platforms as the tenth track of Ruby on March 7.

== Lyrics and composition ==
"Zen" was written by Jennie, Asheton Hogan, Bibi Bourelly, Kirsten Alyssa Spencer, and Jelli Dorman and produced by Pluss. It has been described as a "bare, dramatic, and dark industrial track anchored in synth and drum beats." It appears two-thirds of the way through Ruby near the album's more reflective end. Although the song features a grinding production, lyrically it sees Jennie on an introspective journey towards enlightenment. Using a chant-like delivery, she shares her personal development to find her inner strength. The song depicts a turning point of reflection, acceptance, and "true zenith" in Jennie's storyline on the album. In an interview with Apple Music's The Zane Lowe Show, Jennie explained the intentional dichotomy between the song's message and production, sharing that "'Zen' was made in such a delicate way but to be expressing it in such a loud fierce way, I think that kind of represents who I am." She stated that the song was created after sixth months in the studio and marked the moment she knew her album would be Ruby. After months of growing anxiety and getting lost within herself, she connected with writer Bibi Bourelly, who played a big role in the album. After several conversations with Bourelly about their true motivations and inspirations, the two were able to open themselves up to one another and created "Zen". The song's creation marked the moment her album Ruby started to materialize, with Jennie telling Complex: "That’s when I knew everything was going to fall into place. I'm so proud of myself for not giving up."

== Accolades ==
Awards and nominations for "Zen"
Year	Organization	Award	Result	Ref.
2025	Asian Pop Music Awards	Best Music Video	Nominated	
2025	MAMA Awards	Best Music Video	Won	
2025	MAMA Awards	Song of the Year	Nominated	

== Music video ==
A scene in the music video of Jennie transformed into an owl, a symbol of her rebirth into a new self.

The music video for "Zen" was surprise released on Jennie's YouTube channel on January 25, 2025. It was directed by Cho Gi-seok, a Korean photographer and the founder of streetwear brand KUSIKOHC, and features his signature "delicate, surrealist aesthetics". The three-and-a-half-minute clip follows Jennie as she journeys through cosmic landscapes, showcasing a range of looks that are both elegant and futuristic. She portrays different mythical and celestial personas across numerous realms, appearing "poised, nonchalant and brimming with unrivaled aura." Each of the eight outfits, styled by Park Min-hee, reflects a different side of Jennie’s persona. The imagery of fire, waves, and rain in the video represents external chaos, while her pursuit of peace and balance anchors the narrative. At the start of the video, Jennie stands atop a rock mountain clad in gold armor. In the blink of an eye an army is revealed surrounding her and kneeling at her feet as she says commandingly, "I tell 'em, 'Down, now,' on the energy / I ain’t what you think about me." As the elements change from earth, fire, wind, and water, she transforms 13 times until she becomes a bejeweled silver owl, a symbol of wisdom, strength, and rebirth. This symbolizes her evolution into her ultimate self, free and in control, and her breaking out of the mold she was previously defined by in her career.

== Live performances ==
Jennie included "Zen" on the setlist of her concert tour the Ruby Experience, which commenced in Los Angeles on March 6, 2025 at the same time as Ruby's release. She also performed the song at the Coachella Valley Music and Arts Festival on April 13 and 20. On December 20, Jennie performed "Zen" at the 2025 Melon Music Awards. She performed the song during her headlining set at Lollapalooza on August 1, 2026.

== Usage in media ==
Zen was used as the official soundtrack for the Summer Game Fest trailer in 2025.

== Credits and personnel ==
Credits adapted from the liner notes of Ruby.

Recording

- Recorded at Paradise Sound Recordings LA (Los Angeles, California)
- Mixed at Larrabee Studios (North Hollywood, California)
- Mastered at Sterling Sound (Edgewater, New Jersey)

Personnel

- Jennie – vocals, songwriter
- Asheton Hogan – songwriter, producer
- Badriia "Bibi" Bourelly – songwriter
- Kirsten Alyssa Spencer – songwriter
- Jelli Dorman – songwriter, background vocals, engineer, vocal producer, vocal engineer
- Kuk Harrell – vocal producer, vocal engineer
- Manny Marroquin – mix engineer
- Anthony Vilchis – assistant mix engineer
- Trey Station – assistant mix engineer
- Will Quinnell – mastering engineer

== Charts ==
=== Weekly charts ===
Weekly chart performance
Chart (2025)	Peak position
China (TME Korean)	18
Global 200 (Billboard)	122
Malaysia International (RIM)	19
New Zealand Hot Singles (RMNZ)	13
Philippines (Philippines Hot 100)	100
Singapore (RIAS)	30
South Korea (Circle)	82
UK Video Streaming (OCC)	38

=== Monthly charts ===
Monthly chart performance
Chart (2025)	Position
South Korea (Circle)	124

== Certifications ==
Certifications
Region	Certification	Certified units/sales
Brazil (Pro-Música Brasil)	Gold	20,000^{‡}
^{‡} Sales+streaming figures based on certification alone.
