= Mantra (Jennie song) =

2024 single by Jennie

Single by Jennie

from the album Ruby
- Released: October 11, 2024
- Studio: Paradise Sound Recordings (Los Angeles)
- Genre: Dance-pop; Miami bass; R&B
- Length: 2:16
- Label: Odd Atelier; Columbia
- Songwriters: Jennie; Claudia Valentina; Elle Campbell; Zikai; Jumpa; Billy Walsh; Jelli Dorman; Serban Cazan
- Producers: Jumpa; El Guincho; Serban Cazan; Jelli Dorman

Jennie singles chronology
"Spot!" (2024)	"Mantra" (2024)	"Love Hangover" (2025)

Music video
- "Mantra" on YouTube

"Mantra" is a song by South Korean singer and rapper Jennie. It was released through Odd Atelier and Columbia Records on October 11, 2024, as the lead single from her debut studio album, Ruby (2025). It is Jennie's first release under her own label and her first solo single since departing YG Entertainment and Interscope Records as a solo artist in 2023. The song was written and composed by various contributors, including Jennie, Claudia Valentina, and Zikai, and was produced by El Guincho, Jelli Dorman, Jumpa, and Serban Cazan. It has been described as a dance-pop and Miami bass song that incorporates a heavy dose of R&B, with lyrics that celebrate girl power.

"Mantra" received positive reviews from critics for its catchy production and empowering lyrics. It was a commercial success and peaked at number three on the Billboard Global 200 and number two on the Global Excl. US, becoming Jennie's third and fourth top-ten hit on the charts respectively. In South Korea, the song peaked at number three on the Circle Digital Chart, while it topped the charts in Hong Kong and Taiwan and entered the top ten in Malaysia and Singapore. It marked Jennie's first solo entry on the US Billboard Hot 100 at number 98 and the highest-charting song at the time by a Korean female solo artist on the UK Singles Chart at number 37. The song has since been certified gold by the Recording Industry Association of America (RIAA), Recorded Music NZ (RMNZ), and Music Canada.

An accompanying music video was directed by Tanu Muino and released on Jennie's YouTube channel simultaneously with the single's release. The video reflects the song's themes of empowerment and self-love and features Jennie performing high-octane choreography in a variety of looks throughout Los Angeles. The singer promoted "Mantra" with performances on Jimmy Kimmel Live!, the South Korean music programs M Countdown and Show! Music Core, the Superpop Japan festival, the Coachella Valley Music and Arts Festival, and Blackpink's Deadline World Tour.

== Background and release ==
After departing from YG Entertainment for solo activities, Jennie founded her own record label named Odd Atelier in November 2023. It was further announced on September 8, 2024, that she had signed as a solo artist with Columbia Records in partnership with Odd Atelier. She began teasing new music by posting a video on September 25 of herself hanging a bulletin advertisement that read "Calling all pretty girls." She followed this the next day with a photo of herself standing in an outdoor parking lot with the number 1011 on the side, teasing an October 11 release.

She continued posting video teasers in upcoming days, one of herself in the same parking lot with the caption "PRE-TTY-GIRL" and another captioned "Picked up the phone" showing her tear off a copy of a phone number printed on the bulletin advertisement. On September 28, a video titled "Presenting…" was released which featured Jennie acting out six rules of the "pretty girl mantra" as listed by the narrator, who stated pretty girls are driven, practise self-love, love animals, sleep well, treat themselves and avoid drama. The day after, she shared photos of her leg and waist with the word "mantra" tattooed on them in cursive. On the 30th, she officially announced the single's name as "Mantra" and its release date of October 11 with a flirty teaser video containing a snippet of Jennie singing about girls having fun. The song marked Jennie's first release under Odd Atelier and Columbia Records and served as the lead single from her upcoming debut studio album.

== Composition and lyrics ==
It’s the perfect song to begin my new era. I think ‘Mantra’ will make my fans happy but also show a new side of me as a solo artist. The song was inspired by my time recording in Los Angeles and hopefully fans feel that energy — which is about being positive, being expressive, and being true to who you are. It’s energetic and empowering with a message for all of my ladies, women, and pretty girls out there to love yourself for who you are. This is your anthem.

— Jennie on the song's meaning.

"Mantra" was written by Jennie alongside Claudia Valentina, Elle Campbell, Zikai, Jumpa, Billy Walsh, Jelli Dorman and Serban Cazan, and produced by the latter two with Jumpa and el Guincho. It was described as the artist's take on "messy, bratty pop" with a digital bassline. It is a dance-pop track that features "a heavy dose of R&B" and a Miami bass beat. Lyrically, the song is a feminist anthem that celebrates living a "drama-free existence." In a press release, Jennie stated that the song was creatively inspired by her time in Los Angeles and was made to have an empowering message for women to love themselves. She similarly described the song to Vogue as a "fun, upbeat anthem that celebrates girl power and inspires every woman to shine in her own way with confidence."

== Critical reception ==
Professional ratings
Review scores
Source	Rating
IZM	3/5 stars
NME	4/5 stars

In a review for NME, Puah Ziwei scored "Mantra" four out of five stars and praised it as a "confident, sassy declaration" with a "daring acapella opening [that] makes way for a chant-worthy chorus", but criticized the track for its brevity. Jeff Benjamin of Billboard ranked "Mantra" as the third-best song on Ruby for its "experimental arrangement" that "challenges traditional pop formats, transitioning smoothly between matter-of-fact verses, hushed whispers and assertive rap flows." He praised the song for its "refreshingly unconventional" sound featuring "multifaceted production and bold sonic shifts" and its hypnotic refrain narrating Jennie's journey into a "confident maven". IZM's Lim Seon-hee rated the song three out of five stars and described it as an "unexpected" departure from Jennie's previous singles both sonically and lyrically. He found the steady, unchanging beat conveyed the characteristics of a mantra well and "arouse[d] curiosity" in the audience. The author also noted the lyrics' emphasis on "we" rather than "I" and praised the song as an empowering feminist anthem that "boldly sets up a place of solidarity" for women. L'Officiel Philippines' Andrei Santos lauded the song for its electrifying and infectious production, positively describing it as a "bold anthem that channels Jennie's unshakeable confidence and carefree spirit". Pitchfork's Joshua Minsoo Kim cited the hook as an example of the singer's charisma, calling it an "earworm by sheer force." Writing for Clash, Maria Letícia L. Gomes commended "Mantra" as a "sleek, confident track that feels made for strutting down a runway", pointing to its "cheeky, quotable" lines, the clean production with its tension-building claps, and Jennie's "restrained, almost teasing" vocals that elevate the satisfaction of the chorus drop. Rolling Stone's Maura Johnston praised the track's layering of a "roller-rink-ready beat" with Jennie's "playful vocals". In his review for AllMusic, David Crone complimented "Mantra" as a "foot-forward" hit whose hook could replicate the club success of Le Sserafim's "Crazy". Similarly, Maria Sherman of the Associated Press celebrated the song as among the album's strongest with "brassy production perfect for primetime commercial placement." Writing for The New York Times, Jon Caramanica described it as a "slightly smoothed-out, commercial-ready version" of her approach to modernize the Blackpink sound that features a "burst of vintage electro".

== Accolades ==
Awards and nominations
Year	Organization	Award	Result	Ref.
2024	Asian Pop Music Awards	Best Music Video (Overseas)	Won	
2024	Asian Pop Music Awards	Top 20 Songs of the Year (Overseas)	Won	
2024	Asian Pop Music Awards	People's Choice Award (Overseas)	1st place	
2024	Asian Pop Music Awards	Best Dance Performance (Overseas)	Nominated	
2024	Asian Pop Music Awards	Best Producer (Overseas) (Note: Producers: El Guincho, Jelli Dorman, Jumpa, and Serban Cazan)	Nominated	
2024	Asian Pop Music Awards	Record of the Year (Overseas)	Nominated	
2024	Asian Pop Music Awards	Song of the Year (Overseas)	Nominated	

Music program awards
Program	Date	Ref.
M Countdown	October 17, 2024	

== Commercial performance ==
"Mantra" debuted at number three on the Billboard Global 200 chart with 74.9 million streams and 15,000 sold worldwide in its first full week of tracking between October 11 and 17. It marked her third top-ten on the chart as a soloist after her 2023 singles "You & Me" and "One of the Girls". She tied with her bandmate Lisa's three top tens, while Jisoo and Rosé had one each and their group Blackpink four. The song also debuted at number two on the Billboard Global Excl. US with 69 million streams and 12,000 sold outside the US. Jennie earned her fourth top-ten as a soloist on the chart after "You & Me", "One of the Girls", and "Spot!" (2024), matching the four top tens earned by both Blackpink and Lisa and ahead of Jisoo and Rosé's one each. In its second week, "Mantra" dropped to number six on the Billboard Global 200 and number four on the Global Excl. US. The song charted on the Global 200 for 15 weeks and the Global Excl. US for 27 weeks, surpassing "You & Me" as her second longest-charting song after "One of the Girls" on both charts.

In South Korea, "Mantra" debuted at number 52 on the Circle Digital Chart for the week dated October 12 with less than two days of tracking. In its first full tracking week, it rose to number five, while the explicit version of "Mantra" also debuted at number 54. The song peaked at number three the following week dated October 26, and the explicit version peaked at number 53. The song also debuted at number 98 on the Billboard Hot 100 in the United States, her second entry as a soloist after "One of the Girls". It was later certified gold by the Recording Industry Association of America (RIAA) alongside "Like Jennie" in August 2025, making Jennie the first K-pop solo artist with three RIAA certifications. In the United Kingdom, "Mantra" debuted at number 37 on the UK Singles Chart, breaking the record held by her bandmate Jisoo's "Flower" (2023) for the highest-charting song by a Korean female solo artist in Official Charts history. It marked Jennie's second top-40 hit of the year, after "One of the Girls" peaked at number 21 in January. With "Mantra", she took the lead as the Blackpink member with the most UK top-40 singles, now with a solo tally of two following "You & Me".

== Music video ==
A scene in the music video of Jennie performing with female backup dancers at the Petersen Automotive Museum in Los Angeles, reflecting the song's message of girl power.

An accompanying music video for "Mantra" was directed by Tanu Muino and released alongside the single on October 11 to Jennie's YouTube channel. Upon release, it reached number one on YouTube's trending videos in South Korea, the United States, and worldwide. The video surpassed 100 million views on November 25, 45 days after its release.

The music video is set against the vibrant backdrop of Los Angeles, from where Jennie drew creative inspiration to make the song. It embodies the track's core themes of empowerment and self-love by celebrating female strength and authenticity. According to the singer, the video "reflects the main theme of female empowerment and confidence. It was important for the overall vision to be consistent, and I love how it turned out. I’m so excited to finally put it out there." It begins with a little girl singing along to "Mantra" in the backseat of two men car in rush hour on the Santa Ana Freeway, referencing a scene from the 1998 film Rush Hour. It then cuts to shots of Jennie stepping out of a vintage car in different outfits, before she begins performing the song’s choreography. The remainder of the video shows Jennie in various couture looks in locations all across Los Angeles including the Petersen Automotive Museum. She wears pieces from major fashion brands like Chanel, Versace and Acne Studios, with some of her outfits being a Jean Paul Gaultier graphic mini, a frothy, rose-accented lingerie ensemble from the German fashion label Kitschy Couture, and a fitted Raga Malak T-shirt with swim shorts. Throughout the video, cars are a recurring motif, with Jennie striking poses by a series of high-end convertibles and sports cars. In various scenes, she poses near a color-coordinated auto, lounges in an inflatable swimming pool, dances on the cab of a cherry-red big rig, and snacks on the trunk of a white Lamborghini Countach. The video's final shot sees Jennie and her crew performing choreography as several cars burn around them.

== Live performances ==
Jennie's first televised performance of "Mantra" was on the American late-night talk show Jimmy Kimmel Live! on October 15, which marked her US television debut as a soloist. Her performance was showcased on the show's outdoor stage alongside a group of backup dancers. Jennie performed the song on the South Korean music program M Countdown on October 17, her first time on the show in eight years since performing "Playing with Fire" with Blackpink in 2016. She also performed the song on the music program Show! Music Core on October 19. On November 10, Jennie performed "Mantra" and her previous single "You & Me" at the 2024 Superpop Japan festival. She included "Mantra" on the setlist of her concert tour the Ruby Experience, which commenced in Los Angeles on March 6, 2025, at the same time as Ruby's release. Jennie also performed the song at the Coachella Valley Music and Arts Festival on April 13 and 20, 2025. "Mantra" was later included in Blackpink's Deadline World Tour setlist as a part of Jennie's solo set. In 2026, she included the song in her headlining festival sets at ComplexCon Hong Kong on March 22, Governors Ball Music Festival on June 7, Roskilde Festival on July 3, Open'er Festival on July 4, Mad Cool on July 10, and Lollapalooza on August 1.

== Personnel ==
Credits adapted from the liner notes of Ruby.

Recording

- Recorded and engineered at Paradise Sound Recordings LA (Los Angeles, California)
- Mixed at MixStar Studios (Virginia Beach, Virginia)
- Mastered at Sterling Sound (Edgewater, New Jersey)

Personnel

- Jennie – vocals, songwriter
- Claudia Valentina – songwriter
- Elle Campbell – songwriter
- Zikai – songwriter
- Jumpa – songwriter, producer
- Billy Walsh – songwriter
- Jelli Dorman – songwriter, producer, engineer, vocal producer, vocal engineer, background vocals
- Serban Cazan – songwriter, producer, brass and synth programming
- El Guincho – producer, all instruments and percussion programming
- Kuk Harrell – recording engineer
- Serban Ghenea – mix engineer
- Bryce Bordone – assistant mix engineer
- Will Quinnell – mastering engineer

== Charts ==
=== Weekly charts ===
Weekly chart performance for "Mantra"
Chart (2024–2025)	Peak position
Australia (ARIA)	52
Canada Hot 100 (Billboard)	46
China (TME Korean)	2
Estonia Airplay (TopHit)	99
France (SNEP)	85
Global 200 (Billboard)	3
Greece International (IFPI)	28
Hong Kong (Billboard)	1
India International (IMI)	16
Indonesia (Billboard)	8
Ireland (IRMA)	82
Japan Hot 100 (Billboard)	45
Japan Heatseekers (Billboard Japan)	3
Latvia Airplay (LaIPA)	15
Lithuania (AGATA)	69
Lithuania Airplay (TopHit)	39
Malaysia International (RIM)	2
MENA (IFPI)	7
New Zealand (Recorded Music NZ)	32
Philippines (Philippines Hot 100)	5
Romania Airplay (TopHit)	44
Saudi Arabia (IFPI)	9
Singapore (RIAS)	2
South Korea (Circle)	3
South Korea (Circle) Explicit version	53
Taiwan (Billboard)	1
United Arab Emirates (IFPI)	8
UK Singles (Official Charts)	37
US Billboard Hot 100	98
US Pop Airplay (Billboard)	35

=== Monthly charts ===
Monthly chart performance for "Mantra"
Chart (2024)	Peak position
Latvia Airplay (TopHit)	14
Lithuania Airplay (TopHit)	80
Romania Airplay (TopHit)	51
South Korea (Circle)	6
South Korea (Circle) Explicit version	88

=== Year-end charts ===
2024 year-end chart performance for "Mantra"
Chart (2024)	Position
South Korea (Circle)	114

2025 year-end chart performance for "Mantra"
Chart (2025)	Position
Global 200 (Billboard)	175
South Korea (Circle)	78

== Certifications ==
Certifications for "Mantra"
Region	Certification	Certified units/sales
Brazil (Pro-Música Brasil)	2× Platinum	80,000^{‡}
Canada (Music Canada)	Gold	40,000^{‡}
Mexico (AMPROFON)	Gold	70,000^{‡}
New Zealand (RMNZ)	Gold	15,000^{‡}
United States (RIAA)	Gold	500,000^{‡}
^{‡} Sales+streaming figures based on certification alone.

== Release history ==
Release dates and formats for "Mantra"
Region	Date	Format	Label	Ref.
Various	October 11, 2024	Digital download; streaming	Odd Atelier; Columbia	
Italy	October 18, 2024	Radio airplay	Sony Italy	
United States	November 9, 2024	Contemporary hit radio	Columbia	

== See also ==
- List of Billboard Global 200 top-ten singles in 2024
- List of feminist anthems
- List of K-pop songs on the Billboard charts
- List of M Countdown Chart winners (2024)
- List of number-one songs of 2024 (Hong Kong)
