= Like Jennie =

Single by Jennie

from the album Ruby
- Language: English; Korean
- Released: March 7, 2025
- Studio: Ingrid (Seoul)
- Genre: Hip-hop; Brazilian funk; phonk
- Length: 2:03
- Label: Odd Atelier; Columbia
- Songwriters: Jennie; Tayla Parx; Amanda "Kiddo A.I." Ibanez; Zico; Thomas Wesley Pentz; Jorge Alfonso Sr.
- Producers: Diplo; Leclair; Jaxxtone

Jennie singles chronology
"ExtraL" (2025)	"Like Jennie" (2025)	"Handlebars" (2025)

Music video
- "Like Jennie" on YouTube

"Like Jennie" is a song by South Korean singer and rapper Jennie. It was released through Odd Atelier and Columbia Records on March 7, 2025, as the fourth single from her debut studio album, Ruby (2025), which was released on the same day. It was written by Jennie with Tayla Parx, Amanda Ibanez, Zico, Jorge Alfonso Sr. and Diplo and produced by the latter with Leclair and Jorge. Described as a hip-hop song incorporating Brazilian funk and phonk, it is centered around Jennie's influence and success.

"Like Jennie" received widespread acclaim for Jennie's bold self-confidence and career-best rapping, with critics naming it one of the best K-pop songs of the year. It was a commercial success and became Jennie's third number-one hit on South Korea's Circle Digital Chart as well as the most-streamed K-pop song on Spotify in the first half of 2025. It peaked at number five on the Billboard Global 200 and number three on the Global Excl. US, becoming Jennie's fourth and fifth top-ten hit on the charts respectively. The song also reached number one in Hong Kong and Malaysia and entered the top ten in Indonesia, MENA, Philippines, Saudi Arabia, Singapore, Taiwan, Thailand, UAE, and Vietnam. It peaked at number 36 on the UK Singles Chart and number 83 on the US Billboard Hot 100, her highest solo entry. The song has since been certified platinum in the United States and New Zealand, gold in Canada, France and Japan, and silver in the United Kingdom.

An accompanying music video was directed by Hanbago (Han Gyeol Lee) and released on Jennie's YouTube channel simultaneously with the single's release. The video depicts Jennie as an astronaut before she performs intense choreography with a large crew of backup dancers. It became Vevo's most-watched premiere of the year globally and the first K-pop music video of the year to surpass 100 million views. The singer promoted "Like Jennie" with performances on the Ruby Experience tour, Billboard's Iconic Stage, the Coachella Valley Music and Arts Festival, Blackpink's Deadline World Tour, the 2025 Melon Music Awards, and the 40th Golden Disc Awards. The song was awarded Best Digital Song at the ceremony as well as Best Dance Performance at the 2025 MAMA Awards and Best K-pop Song at the 23rd Korean Music Awards.

== Background and release ==
On February 18, 2025, Jennie revealed the tracklist of her debut solo album, Ruby, which contained a song titled "Like Jennie". On February 27, Jennie released an album sampler video with snippets of unreleased songs from the album, including "Like Jennie". She confirmed it to be the album's title track with a teaser video released on March 3, showing various Polaroid photos of herself over a snippet of the chorus. The following day, she released a concept photo for the single depicting her gazing into the camera as she wears a red spacesuit. She released a second concept photo for the song on March 5 showing her with a unique hairstyle and tank top spacesuit. "Like Jennie" was released as the fourth single from Ruby simultaneously with the album's release on March 7. On April 11, the singer released a remix of the song with South Korean DJ Peggy Gou. On April 25, Jennie released an extended version of the Peggy Gou remix.

== Composition and lyrics ==
"Like Jennie" was co-produced by Diplo and co-written by Jennie and Zico, with whom she previously collaborated in 2024 on his single "Spot!". The song features a "metallic" beat that combines baile funk and phonk using funk carioca drums, a crisp drum loop and bouncing synths for a "club-ready feel." It was described as a hip-hop song highlighted by "Jennie's rapping skills and fresh style". Lyrically, it is about her influence and how there "could never ever be" another Jennie. In the chorus, she sings "Who wanna rock with Jennie? / Keep your hair done, nails done like Jennie / Who else got 'em obsessed like Jennie?", noting her impact on fashion trends. The song emphasizes Jennie's individuality and originality, as she sings about walking down her own path with confidence and knowing that no one can take her place. In the second verse, she delivers a rap verse in Korean, the only section in that language on the album.

== Critical reception ==
"Like Jennie" received widespread acclaim from critics and was acknowledged by Forbes as the most acclaimed K-pop soloist song of 2025. Billboard's Jeff Benjamin declared it the best song on the album and a "vibrant manifesto of Jennie's identity" that "cements her it girl status." He praised the song's writing and production for adding "extra, irresistible punches to amplify some of the best rapping of Jennie's career." Writing for NME, Crystal Bell called "Like Jennie" "the kind of song only she could pull off – a declaration of dominance wrapped in effortless cool." Joshua Minsoo Kim of Pitchfork also lauded Jennie's "snarled delivery" on the rap verse as "especially convincing when it flits between Korean and English" and called "Like Jennie" a song needed by every Blackpink member that "translates their tough-girl sound into a blistering new style." Clash's Letícia L. Gomes named it the "defining moment of Ruby" and a "brash, self-referential anthem where she fully embraces her star power", pointing to Jennie's Korean verse as the standout portion, though she noted the song feels "slightly rushed". The New York Times's Jon Caramanica praised it as a "wild dance-floor romp" that "futurizes the Blackpink sound, and features some of Jennie's toughest rapping."

Multiple publications placed "Like Jennie" on their list of the best K-pop songs of the year. The Hollywood Reporter's Nicole Fell ranked it the third best K-pop song of 2025 and a "reminder of why Jennie has long been K-pop’s IT girl." Billboard named it the fifth best K-pop song of the year, with Jeff Benjamin arguing that it "distilled Jennie's celebrity into a short, savage and precisely produced statement single" and demonstrated "how K-pop stars can infuse their personas into widely accessible hits without diluting their identity." Dazed's Taylor Glasby called it one of the year's best K-pop songs and a "prime candidate as the year’s most perfect pop banger". The Fader included "Like Jennie" on their list of the best songs of 2025 at number 43, with India Roby praising Jennie's "strongest and sharpest flows yet". Likewise, NME's Daniel Anderson ranked it the fourth best K-pop song of the year and a "raucous masterclass in girlbossing" that marks Jennie's "spectacular emergence as a solo star." Writing for Rolling Stone India, Debashree Dutta placed "Like Jennie" on their list of the best K-pop songs of the year and commended its "relentless energy and unforgettable hook".

After a nine-second teaser of "Like Jennie" was released, some social media users found the song to be similar to "Rani's Intro Theme" from 2023 film Rocky Aur Rani Kii Prem Kahaani. Pritam, the composer of "Rani's Intro Theme", dismissed claims of plagiarism, stating that "Rani and Jennie are names that rhyme, so a similar flow in one phrase doesn't make it a copy."

"Like Jennie" on listicles
Critic/Publication	List	Rank	Ref.
Billboard	The 25 Best K-Pop Songs of 2025 (So Far): Critic's Picks	1	
Billboard	The 25 Best K-Pop Songs of 2025: Staff Picks	5	
Billboard Brasil	The 25 best K-pop songs of 2025	1	
Dazed	The 30 best K-pop tracks of 2025	—N/a	
The Fader	The 51 best songs of 2025	43	
The Hollywood Reporter	The 40 Best K-pop Songs of 2025	3	
NME	The 25 best K-pop songs of 2025	4	
Rolling Stone India	The 25 Best K-Pop Songs of 2025	—N/a	

== Accolades ==
"Like Jennie" won five first-place awards on South Korean music programs, including a triple crown on M Countdown.

Awards and nominations
Year	Organization	Award	Result	Ref.
2025	Asian Pop Music Awards	Best Dance Performance	Won	
2025	Asian Pop Music Awards	Top 20 Songs of the Year	Won	
2025	Asian Pop Music Awards	Best Lyricist (Note: Lyricists: Jennie, Tayla Parx, Amanda "Kiddo A.I." Ibanez, Zico, Thomas Wesley Pentz, Jorge Antonio Alfonzo Sr.)	Nominated	
2025	Asian Pop Music Awards	Song of the Year	Nominated	
2025	BreakTudo Awards	International Hit of the Year	Nominated	
2025	MAMA Awards	Best Dance Performance Female Solo	Won	
2025	MAMA Awards	Song of the Year	Nominated	
2025	MAMA Awards	Best Choreography	Nominated	
2025	Melon Music Awards	Song of the Year	Nominated	
2025	MTV Video Music Awards	Best K-Pop	Nominated	
2026	Golden Disc Awards	Best Digital Song (Bonsang)	Won	
2026	Golden Disc Awards	Song of the Year (Daesang)	Nominated	
2026	iHeartRadio Music Awards	Best Music Video	Nominated	
2026	iHeartRadio Music Awards	Favorite TikTok Dance	Nominated	
2026	iHeartRadio Music Awards	K-pop Song of the Year	Nominated	
2026	Japan Gold Disc Awards	Song of the Year by Download (Western)	Won	
2026	Korean Music Awards	Best K-pop Song	Won	
2026	Korean Music Awards	Song of the Year	Nominated	
2026	Music Awards Japan	Best K-Pop Song in Japan	Nominated	
2026	Music Awards Japan	Best of Listeners' Choice: International Song	Nominated	

Music program awards
Program	Date	Ref.
M Countdown	March 20, 2025	
M Countdown	March 27, 2025	
M Countdown	April 3, 2025	
Show Champion	April 2, 2025	
Show! Music Core	April 12, 2025	

== Commercial performance ==
"Like Jennie" debuted at number five on the Billboard Global 200 with 68.4 million streams and 6,000 sold worldwide in its first week of release. It marked her fourth top-ten hit on the chart after "You & Me" and "One of the Girls" (both 2023) and "Mantra". She tied her group Blackpink's four top tens and surpassed her bandmates Lisa's three, while extending her lead over Rosé's two and Jisoo's one top ten each. The song also debuted at number three on the Billboard Global Excl. US with 61.5 million streams and 4,000 sold outside the US. She achieved her fifth top-ten hit on the chart after "You & Me", "One of the Girls", "Spot!" (2024), and "Mantra". With this, she surpassed Blackpink and Lisa's four top tens each and extended her lead over Rosé's two and Jisoo's one each. "Like Jennie" was the most-streamed K-pop song on Spotify in the first half of 2025 between January 1 and June 30, according to the streaming platform's Global Impact List. It also became the most-streamed song by a female artist of the year on the platform.

In South Korea, Jennie became the first female solo artist to top the Melon top 100 chart and daily chart in 2025 with "Like Jennie". The song debuted at number 75 on the Circle Digital Chart for the week dated March 8 with less than two days of tracking. In its first full tracking week, it rose to number three, where it remained for another three consecutive weeks. The song rose to number two on the chart two weeks later, before reaching its peak at number one the following week dated April 26. With this, Jennie earned her third number-one single on the chart after "Solo" (2018) and "Spot!". "Like Jennie" remained at number one for a second consecutive week on the chart dated May 3. The song contributed to a trend of solo acts taking over Korea's digital music charts, a shift from the previous domination of K-pop groups. From March to May 2025, solo artists including Jennie held all five top positions on the Circle Digital Chart for eight consecutive weeks. By the end of the year, "Like Jennie" ranked as the third-most loved song of 2025 by TikTok users in South Korea.

In the United States, "Like Jennie" debuted and peaked at number 83 on the Billboard Hot 100, charting simultaneously with "ExtraL" and "Handlebars". This made Jennie the first K-pop female soloist to have three songs on the chart in the same week, as well as the K-pop female soloist with the most total entries on the chart (six). It also marked her highest-peaking solo entry on the chart. Following her performance at Coachella in April, "Like Jennie" re-entered the Billboard Hot 100 at number 96. It was certified gold by the Recording Industry Association of America (RIAA) alongside "Mantra" in August, making Jennie the first K-pop solo artist with three RIAA certifications. In March 2026, the song was certified platinum by the RIAA, marking her second platinum record after "One of the Girls".

== Music video ==
An accompanying music video for "Like Jennie" was directed by Hanbago (Han Gyeol Lee) and released alongside the single on Jennie's YouTube channel on March 7. It was live streamed upon its release on a large billboard in Shinsegae Square, Seoul. It became Vevo's most-watched premiere of the year globally, marking the first time a K-pop artist has topped the Vevo charts. The music video surpassed 100 million views on May 9, becoming the first K-pop music video released in 2025 to achieve the feat. It marked Jennie's third music video to reach the milestone, following "Solo" and "Mantra". A visualizer for the Peggy Gou remix of "Like Jennie" was also released on April 11, which was created by Jack Zhang at Animate Jack and depicts the artists as anime-inspired boxing characters.

At the start of the music video, Jennie comes into frame pulling back red curtains. She appears onscreen as an astronaut wearing a ruby red spacesuit. She swallows something in the shape of the letter "J" floating in the air, resulting in her eye color changing and her outfit transforming into a "hip styling". Jennie then begins chanting and dancing to the chorus, performing choreography with a large crew of backup dancers. At the end of the video, wearing the same red spacesuit from the beginning, she catches on fire and transforms into a capybara. Next to the capybara lies a blue rose, signaling Jennie's new birth.

== Live performances ==
Jennie included "Like Jennie" on the setlist of her concert tour the Ruby Experience, which commenced in Los Angeles on March 6, 2025, at the same time as Ruby's release. She performed it for Billboard's Iconic Stage, which was uploaded to Billboard and Billboard Korea's official YouTube channels on March 12. She also performed the song at the Coachella Valley Music and Arts Festival on April 13 and 20. "Like Jennie" was later included in Blackpink's Deadline World Tour setlist starting July 5 as a part of Jennie's solo set. On December 20, Jennie performed "Like Jennie" at the 2025 Melon Music Awards. She also performed it at the 40th Golden Disc Awards on January 10, 2026. She included the song in her headlining festival sets at ComplexCon Hong Kong on March 22, Governors Ball Music Festival on June 7, Roskilde Festival on July 3, Open'er Festival on July 4, Mad Cool on July 10, and Lollapalooza on August 1.

== Usage in media ==
On September 15, 2025, EA Sports revealed that the song would be included in the soundtrack for the football simulation video game EA Sports FC 26, her debut in the series.

"Like Jennie" was played at the 83rd Golden Globe Awards on January 11, 2026, as Jennifer Lopez stepped onstage to present the award for Best Actor in a Motion Picture – Musical or Comedy. Similarly, episode two of the first season of the Amazon Prime series Off Campus (2026) uses the song to soundtrack Allie (Mika Abdalla) attending a party dressed as Lopez.

== Track listing ==
- Digital download and streaming
1. "Like Jennie" – 2:03
2. "Like Jennie" (Peggy Gou remix) – 3:28
3. "Like Jennie" (Peggy Gou remix; extended mix) – 5:07

== Credits and personnel ==
Credits adapted from the liner notes of Ruby.

Recording

- Recorded and engineered at Ingrid Studio (Seoul, South Korea)
- Mixed at Larrabee Studios (North Hollywood, California)
- Mastered at Sterling Sound (Edgewater, New Jersey)

Personnel

- Jennie – vocals, songwriter
- Tayla Parx – songwriter, background vocals
- Amanda "Kiddo A.I." Ibanez – songwriter, background vocals
- Zico – songwriter
- Diplo – songwriter, producer
- Jorge Alfonso Sr. – songwriter
- Leclair – producer
- Jorge – producer
- Eunkyung Jung – recording engineer
- Chris "Tek" O'Ryan – vocal producer
- Manny Marroquin – mix engineer
- Will Quinnell – mastering engineer

== Charts ==
=== Weekly charts ===
Weekly chart performance for "Like Jennie"
Chart (2025)	Peak position
Australia (ARIA)	35
Austria (Ö3 Austria Top 40)	72
Brazil Hot 100 (Billboard)	66
Canada Hot 100 (Billboard)	42
Chile Anglo Airplay (Monitor Latino)	9
China (TME Korean)	3
France (SNEP)	52
Germany (GfK)	71
Global 200 (Billboard)	5
Greece International (IFPI)	17
Hong Kong (Billboard)	1
India International (IMI)	6
Indonesia (IFPI)	5
Ireland (IRMA)	66
Japan Hot 100 (Billboard)	32
Japan Combined Singles (Oricon)	40
Lithuania (AGATA)	55
Lithuania Airplay (TopHit)	71
Malaysia (IFPI)	1
Middle East and North Africa (IFPI)	3
New Zealand (Recorded Music NZ)	31
Nicaragua Anglo Airplay (Monitor Latino)	3
Peru (Billboard)	25
Philippines (IFPI)	5
Portugal (AFP)	55
Saudi Arabia (IFPI)	2
Singapore (RIAS)	2
Slovakia Singles Digital (ČNS IFPI)	65
South Korea (Circle)	1
Sweden Heatseeker (Sverigetopplistan)	14
Switzerland (Schweizer Hitparade)	61
Taiwan (Billboard)	2
Thailand (IFPI)	2
United Arab Emirates (IFPI)	5
UK Singles (Official Charts)	36
US Billboard Hot 100	83
US Pop Airplay (Billboard)	30
Venezuela Anglo Airplay (Monitor Latino)	7
Vietnam (IFPI)	3

=== Monthly charts ===
Monthly chart performance for "Like Jennie"
Chart (2025)	Peak position
Lithuania Airplay (TopHit)	97
South Korea (Circle)	2

=== Year-end charts ===
Year-end chart performance for "Like Jennie"
Chart (2025)	Position
Global 200 (Billboard)	49
Japan Heatseekers Songs (Billboard Japan)	3
India International (IMI)	19
Philippines (Philippines Hot 100)	32
South Korea (Circle)	11

== Certifications ==
Certifications for "Like Jennie"
Region	Certification	Certified units/sales
Belgium (BRMA)	Gold	20,000^{‡}
Brazil (Pro-Música Brasil)	3× Platinum	120,000^{‡}
Canada (Music Canada)	Gold	40,000^{‡}
France (SNEP)	Gold	100,000^{‡}
Hungary (MAHASZ)	Platinum	4,000^{‡}
Mexico (AMPROFON)	Platinum	140,000^{‡}
New Zealand (RMNZ)	Platinum	30,000^{‡}
Poland (ZPAV)	Gold	62,500^{‡}
Portugal (AFP)	Gold	5,000^{‡}
Spain (Promusicae)	Gold	50,000^{‡}
United Kingdom (BPI)	Silver	200,000^{‡}
United States (RIAA)	Platinum	1,000,000^{‡}
Streaming
Central America (CFC)	Gold	3,500,000^{†}
Greece (IFPI Greece)	Gold	1,000,000^{†}
Japan (RIAJ)	Gold	50,000,000^{†}
^{‡} Sales+streaming figures based on certification alone.^{†} Streaming-only figures based on certification alone.

== Release history ==
Release dates and formats for "Like Jennie"
Region	Date	Format	Version	Label	Ref.
Various	March 7, 2025	Digital download; streaming	Original	Odd Atelier; Columbia	
United States	March 25, 2025	Contemporary hit radio	Original	Columbia	
Various	April 11, 2025	Digital download; streaming	Peggy Gou remix	Odd Atelier; Columbia	
Italy	April 11, 2025	Radio airplay	Peggy Gou remix	Sony Music Italy	
Various	April 25, 2025	Digital download; streaming	Peggy Gou remix extended mix	Odd Atelier; Columbia	

== See also ==
- List of Billboard Global 200 top-ten singles in 2025
- List of Circle Digital Chart number ones of 2025
- List of K-pop songs on the Billboard charts
- List of M Countdown Chart winners (2025)
- List of number-one songs of 2025 (Hong Kong)
- List of number-one songs of 2025 (Malaysia)
- List of Show! Music Core Chart winners (2025)
- List of Show Champion Chart winners (2025)
