= Love Hangover (Jennie song) =

Single by Jennie featuring Dominic Fike

from the album Ruby
- Released: January 31, 2025
- Studio: Paradise Sound Recordings (Los Angeles)
- Genre: R&B; pop
- Length: 3:00
- Label: Odd Atelier; Columbia
- Songwriters: Dominic Fike; Ido Zmishlany; Megan Bülow; Blaise Railey; Carly Gibert; Devin Workman
- Producers: Jennie; Ido Zmishlany

Jennie singles chronology
"Mantra" (2024)	"Love Hangover" (2025)	"ExtraL" (2025)

Dominic Fike singles chronology
"Mama's Boy" (2023)	"Love Hangover" (2025)	"White Keys" (2025)

Music video
- "Love Hangover" on YouTube

"Love Hangover" is a song by South Korean singer and rapper Jennie featuring American singer Dominic Fike. It was released through Odd Atelier and Columbia Records on January 31, 2025, as the second single from her debut studio album, Ruby (2025). The song was produced by Jennie and Ido Zmishlany, who also co-wrote it with Fike, Megan Bülow, Blaise Railey, Carly Gibert, and Devin Workman. A slow-paced R&B and pop track, it contains vulnerable lyrics about a recurring and destructive relationship.

Critics praised "Love Hangover" for its lyrical intimacy and Jennie's smooth vocal delivery. It debuted at number 29 on the Billboard Global 200 and became her third entry on the US Billboard Hot 100 at number 96. It also peaked within the top ten in several Asian countries, including Hong Kong, Malaysia, Singapore, Taiwan, and Thailand, and at number 35 on South Korea's Circle Digital Chart.

An accompanying music video was directed by Bradley & Pablo and released on Jennie's YouTube channel simultaneously with the single's release. The video stars Jennie with American actor Charles Melton as a couple going on dates that all end in her death, a dark reflection of the song's lyrics. The singer performed "Love Hangover" on the Ruby Experience tour and the Coachella Valley Music and Arts Festival.

== Background and release ==
After her departure from YG Entertainment for solo activities, Jennie founded her own record label named Odd Atelier in November 2023. She subsequently signed as a solo artist with Columbia Records in partnership with Odd Atelier in September 2024. On October 11, 2024, Jennie released "Mantra" through Odd Atelier and Columbia Records as the lead single of her debut studio album, Ruby. She began teasing a follow-up by releasing a snippet of a track accompanied by an image of a telephone on her official website. She also posted a photo of a burial site from an underground point of view on Instagram, showing a behind-the-scenes moment from the filming of a then unannounced music video. On January 26, 2025, she officially announced the album's second single titled "Love Hangover" by uploading an image of a heart-shaped gravestone that displayed the track's name and release date of January 31. The next day, she revealed the song was a collaboration with American singer Dominic Fike in a teaser photo post of herself lying in a coffin holding blue flowers; she later posted a video of herself in the same location singing along to a snippet of the track. She further shared a snapshot of herself with Fike captioned "call me back" on January 29.

== Composition and lyrics ==
"Love Hangover" is a "smooth, traditional R&B" and "slow-burn, midtempo pop" song that is seemingly inspired by Diana Ross' 1976 song of the same name. It has further been described as a "hazy post-break" track marked with "retro soul flourishes and programmed idiosyncrasies". The lyrics explore the "emotional turmoil of an irresistible yet toxic attraction". In the chorus, Jennie sings: "We say it’s over/ But I keep fucking with you/ And every time I do, I wake up with this love hangover", expressing her struggle fighting an attraction to someone she hates to love. Dominic Fike comes in the second verse to rap: "She gon' leave me, but she wants to keep me on, what's up with that?", continuing the theme of struggling to break free from a connection that won't let go.

== Critical reception ==
Writing for Billboard, Jeff Benjamin ranked "Love Hangover" as the fifth-best song on Ruby that allows Jennie to explore a "softer, more romantic side" of herself. He found the song to be a "refreshing interlude packed with heartfelt vulnerability" that manages to keep the album's energy high with its percussive outro, and praised its "warm, mellow groove and Fike’s multifaceted rap" for complementing Jennie's "gentle coos". NME's Crystal Bell praised the song for blending "soulful intimacy with a laid-back groove" with a "smooth assist" by Dominic Fike. Maria Sherman wrote in her review for the Associated Press that the singer's "chameleonic vocal performance is so convincing, the recording almost doesn’t even sound like Jennie." Maria Letícia L. Gomes of Clash similarly commended the "smooth, intimate track" for bringing out Jennie's most "organic vocal delivery yet" that "glides over the track effortlessly". She added that the song "grows on you, revealing more depth with each listen", with a mellow production invoking the feel of a "breezy, late-night-drive" and some of the album's best melodies. The publication ranked "Love Hangover" at number 37 on their list of songs that defined the year 2025.

== Accolades ==
Awards and nominations for "Love Hangover"
Year	Organization	Award	Result	Ref.
2026	Clio Awards	Music Marketing – Direction	Bronze	

Music program awards
Program	Date	Ref.
M Countdown	February 20, 2025	

== Music video ==
A scene in the music video of Jennie lying in a coffin after dying numerous times, a dramatic reflection of the song's lyrics.

Each time I go out on a date, I keep dying when I fall in love. The lyrics are somewhat like that, knowing that I’ll get hurt and that it will be tough, but why do I fall in love again and get drunk with that love? It’s about the hangover of love. When I heard it for the first time, I just really related to it. Anyone who has dated and been in love can easily relate to it.

— Jennie on how the song's lyrics inspired the music video, Hyell's Club

An accompanying music video for "Love Hangover" was released alongside the single on January 31. Directed by duo Bradley & Pablo and shot in Mexico City, the video stars American actor Charles Melton as Jennie's boyfriend and sees the two going on a series of dates that all end in disaster. In the opening scene, Jennie gets laid to rest at her funeral in a baby blue casket as her boyfriend grieves. Several flashbacks to their dates show that they each end with Jennie's untimely death, depicting her being eaten by a kaiju that pops out of a movie screen, choking on a martini olive at a restaurant, throwing herself into a bowling accident, and falling from a great height. On Lee Hye-ri's YouTube show Hyell's Club, Jennie explained that the concept of the music video was inspired as a dramatic reflection of the song's lyrics, in which she continues to fall in love despite getting hurt and "dying" each time.

== Live performances ==
Jennie uploaded a live performance video of "Love Hangover" to her YouTube channel on February 11, 2025, in which she performs the song solo with her own verse replacing Fike's. She included the song on the setlist of her concert tour the Ruby Experience, which commenced in Los Angeles on March 6 at the same time as Ruby's release. Jennie also performed it at the Coachella Valley Music and Arts Festival on April 13 and 20. In 2026, she included the song in her headlining festival sets at ComplexCon Hong Kong on March 22, Governors Ball Music Festival on June 7, Roskilde Festival on July 3, Open'er Festival on July 4, Mad Cool on July 10, and Lollapalooza on August 1.

== Credits and personnel ==
Credits adapted from the liner notes of Ruby and Tidal.

Recording

- Recorded at Paradise Sound Recordings LA (Los Angeles, California)
- Mixed at Larrabee Studios (North Hollywood, California)
- Mastered at Sterling Sound (Edgewater, New Jersey)

Personnel

- Jennie – vocals, producer
- Dominic Fike – featured vocals, songwriter (Dominic Fike version)
- Ido Zmishlany – songwriter, producer, background vocals, drums, bass, synth bass, Rhodes, clavinet, Juno, drum programming
- Megan Bülow – songwriter, background vocals
- Blaise Railey – songwriter, background vocals
- Carly Gibert – songwriter, background vocals
- Devin Workman – songwriter (Dominic Fike version)
- Jelli Dorman – engineer, vocal producer, vocal engineer, vocal programming
- Kuk Harrell – recording engineer, vocal producer, vocal engineer
- Noah Gottdenker – engineer (Dominic Fike version)
- Bryce Bordone – assistant engineer (Dominic Fike version)
- Will Lamoreux – associated performer, viola, violin (Dominic Fike version)
- Manny Marroquin – mix engineer
- Anthony Vilchis – assistant mix engineer
- Trey Station – assistant mix engineer
- Will Quinnell – mastering engineer

== Charts ==
=== Weekly charts ===
Weekly chart performance
Chart (2025)	Peak position
Canada Hot 100 (Billboard)	72
China (TME Korean)	8
Global 200 (Billboard)	29
Hong Kong (Billboard)	10
Lithuania Airplay (TopHit)	77
Malaysia (IFPI)	9
New Zealand Hot Singles (RMNZ)	7
Nigeria (TurnTable Top 100)	65
Philippines (Philippines Hot 100)	16
Singapore (RIAS)	5
South Korea (Circle)	35
Taiwan (Billboard)	9
Thailand (IFPI)	7
UK Singles (Official Charts)	64
Uruguay Anglo Airplay (Monitor Latino)	11
US Billboard Hot 100	96
Vietnam (IFPI)	12

=== Monthly charts ===
Monthly chart performance
Chart (2025)	Position
South Korea (Circle)	45

== Certifications ==
Certifications
Region	Certification	Certified units/sales
Brazil (Pro-Música Brasil)	Platinum	40,000^{‡}
^{‡} Sales+streaming figures based on certification alone.

== Release history ==
Release history
Region	Date	Format	Label	Ref.
Various	January 31, 2025	Digital download; streaming	Odd Atelier; Columbia	

== See also ==
- List of K-pop songs on the Billboard charts
- List of M Countdown Chart winners (2025)
