= Ruby (Jennie album) =

- Digital and standard cover

Studio album by Jennie
- Released: March 7, 2025
- Recorded: 2024
- Studios: Ingrid (Seoul); Level Up (Copenhagen); Paradise Sound Recordings (Los Angeles); Conway (Los Angeles); Ponzu (Los Angeles); Westlake Recording (Los Angeles); Chalice Recording (Los Angeles); Alo (Beverly Hills)
- Genres: Pop; hip-hop; R&B
- Length: 41:30
- Languages: English; Korean
- Labels: Odd Atelier; Columbia
- Producers: Mike Will Made It; Dem Jointz; Pluss; Jelli Dorman; Gage; Jennie; Ido Zmishlany; 30 Roc; Rob Bisel; Serban Cazan; Diplo; FKJ; El Guincho; Sam Homaee; Jonas Jeberg; Jorge; Jumpa; Leclair; Melz; MoneyGoForMyles; Resource; Ramus Søegren; Truebeatz; Xeryus

Jennie chronology
Ruby (2025)	Fallen Angel (2026)

Singles from Ruby
- 1. "Mantra" Released: October 11, 2024; 2. "Love Hangover" Released: January 31, 2025; 3. "ExtraL" Released: February 21, 2025; 4. "Like Jennie" Released: March 7, 2025; 5. "Handlebars" Released: March 11, 2025

Ruby is the debut solo studio album by South Korean singer and rapper Jennie. Released on March 7, 2025, by Odd Atelier and Columbia Records, it was Jennie's first album after leaving YG Entertainment as a solo artist and Interscope Records in 2023. Jennie wrote and co-produced Ruby with collaborators, including El Guincho, Diplo, and Mike Will Made It. The 15-track pop, hip-hop, and R&B album features Childish Gambino, Doechii, Dominic Fike, FKJ, Dua Lipa, and Kali Uchis. The lyrics allude to Jennie's relationships, influence, and success.

Ruby received generally positive reviews from critics, who noted its cohesion, cinematic production and experimental nature and praised its emotional depth, Jennie's versatility, performances, lyricism and worth as a solo artist. The album has sold over one million copies worldwide and was named one of the best albums of 2025 by numerous publications including Rolling Stone and Billboard. It debuted in the top ten in 19 countries, including Australia, France, Germany, the Netherlands, New Zealand, South Korea, and the United States. Ruby sold more than 660,000 copies in its first week in South Korea, the year's highest first-week album sales for a K-pop female solo artist. It debuted at number three on the UK Albums Chart, becoming the highest-ranked album by a K-pop female soloist and tying for the highest-ranked album overall by a K-pop solo artist. The album has been certified triple platinum by the Korea Music Content Association (KMCA) for selling 750,000 copies as well as gold by the Recording Industry Association of America (RIAA), Recorded Music NZ (RMNZ) and SNEP and silver by the British Phonographic Industry (BPI).

The album was supported by five singles: "Mantra", "Love Hangover", "ExtraL", "Like Jennie" and ”Handlebars". "Mantra" peaked at number three on the Billboard Global 200 and South Korea's Circle Digital Chart, while "Like Jennie" peaked at number five on the Global 200 and became Jennie's third number-one song on the Circle Digital Chart. All singles also peaked within the top 30 of the Global 200 and entered the US Billboard Hot 100. Jennie released music videos for all singles as well as the tracks "Zen" and "Seoul City". The supporting tour, dubbed the Ruby Experience, began on March 6 and included five shows in four cities, as well as the 2025 Coachella Valley Music and Arts Festival. The album received several accolades, including Best K-pop Album at the 23rd Korean Music Awards.

== Background ==
In December 2023, months after leaving YG Entertainment, Jennie announced that she had founded a record label, Odd Atelier. During her January 2024 appearance on The Seasons: Lee Hyo-ri's Red Carpet, Jennie said she aimed to release a full-length album that year. Two months later, South Korean news outlets reported that she would release an album in June. Odd Atelier denied the rumors, stating Jennie was working on the album with no scheduled release date. After their April collaboration "Spot!", South Korean rapper Zico revealed to Billboard he had "the chance to peek at Jennie's to-be-released solo track demos" and that there were "so many good ones". In May, while attending the Met Gala's Sleeping Beauties: Reawakening Fashion, she told Vogue, "I also have a lot more coming with my album, wink, wink." On June 20, a Beats Solo Buds advertisement included a solo track of hers, which was presumed to be on her upcoming album. In the song, she raps over a trap beat about taking back her narrative and standing up for herself.

In September, it was announced Jennie had signed a recording contract with Columbia Records in partnership with Odd Atelier. In an October Harper's Bazaar cover story, she said she was in the studio going over lyrics and "cutting, cutting, cutting" vocals from "morning to night." The following month, she announced in a Weverse post that the album would be released in 2025. On Christmas Day, she said in a holiday greeting video that she had "satisfactory results from 11 months of work" and that it will be "a little bit of everything for everyone. It's like a buffet for you guys." In January 2025, Jennie appeared in a cover story for Billboard, where she discussed her album preparations, stating she was "almost there" in terms of its release.

== Composition ==
Ruby's 15 tracks include contributions from Childish Gambino, Doechii, Dominic Fike, FKJ, Dua Lipa. and Kali Uchis. Jennie recorded the album primarily in English. She described it as a way of "bringing myself to the world for the first time" as "Jennie Ruby Jane, for that to be a whole person", referring to the alter ego she invented when she lived in New Zealand as a child. She has said the album was inspired by William Shakespeare's play As You Like It (c. 1599), including its seven stages of life, and carries themes of "birth, love, faith, and pinnacle," "innocence and love to power, reflection and legacy". The cover depicts Jennie opening a theater curtain, the beginning of a new chapter in her musical career. She hoped the album would inspire young women "to understand and stick [up] for who you are".

== Production and music ==
After Blackpink's Born Pink World Tour ended in September 2023, Jennie established Odd Atelier in November. She began working on the album at the start of 2024. She recorded "99%" of the project in Los Angeles, where she spent time building a new creative network and meeting with producers and writers. The artist said it took several months of "throwing myself out there, walking into rooms filled with new people" until she came across a "good group of people that I linked with, sonically and as friends". She found her sound in the song "Mantra", which became the album's lead single.

Jennie said the album includes a "range of genres". She used various vocal styles on the record, stating: "I'm playing with a lot of different genres and elements — I'm rapping here, I'm singing here, I'm harmonizing here, I'm talking here..." Jennie took a hands-on approach to production on the album to "more effectively convey her identity and infinite musical potential."

== Promotion and release ==
On January 21, 2025, Jennie announced that Ruby would be released on March 7, revealed the cover art, and released a 33-second trailer video that listed featured artists. A version of the album known as "Jennie Only Audio" was announced without the featured artists. Jennie revealed the album's tracklist on February 18. She released an album sampler video on February 27; it depicted the singer in various visual concepts over snippets of songs from the album.

To promote the album, Jennie appeared on online talk shows, including Apple Music 1's The Zane Lowe Show, Capital Breakfast's Very British Birthday Party, Chicken Shop Date, and The Jennifer Hudson Show. She was interviewed for cover stories with publications such as Complex, Harper's Bazaar, Billboard, and Clash.

On March 6, 2026, Jennie issued Ruby (The Complete Collection) for the album's one-year anniversary. The release added six tracks to the original tracklist, such as "Jennie Only" versions and new remixes. It was released with an updated cover featuring a "Complete Collection" label to differentiate it from the 2025 standard edition. Furthermore, a pop-up store entitled "A Year in Ruby" run from March 5–11, at The Hyundai Seoul in Yeouido.

=== Singles ===
"Mantra" was released as the album's lead single on October 11, 2024. The song was commercially successful, peaking at number one in Hong Kong and Taiwan, number two on Billboard's Global Excl. US; and number three on Global 200. The song also peaked at number three on South Korea's Circle Digital Chart, and within the top-ten in Indonesia, Malaysia, Philippines, Singapore, and the Middle East. On January 25, 2025, a music video for "Zen" was published on YouTube. The album's second single, "Love Hangover" featuring Fike, was released on January 31, which peaked at number 29 on the Billboard Global 200 and number 35 on the Circle Digital Chart. A third single titled "ExtraL" featuring Doechii was released on February 21, peaking at number 18 on the Billboard Global 200 and number 42 on the Circle Digital Chart.

"Like Jennie" was released as the fourth single with the album's release on March 7, 2025. It was a commercial success and peaked at number one in South Korea, Hong Kong, and Malaysia, three on the Billboard Global Excl. US and five on Global 200. "Handlebars" was sent to US contemporary hit radio as the album's fifth single on March 11, and was released to Italian radio by Sony Music Italy three days later. A music video was released on March 10. The song peaked at number 21 on the Billboard Global 200 and number 68 on the Circle Digital Chart. On April 26, Jennie released the album's seventh music video, for the song "Seoul City".

=== Brand collaborations ===
Following the release of Ruby, Jennie engaged in several collaborations inspired by her first studio album. In September 2025, she partnered with Beats by Dre to release the special edition Jennie Ruby Red Beats Solo 4 wireless headphones. During the same month, she collaborated with American drinkware brand Stanley 1913 to release the limited edition Stanley 1913 x Jennie collection in Midnight Ruby. In November, Jennie partnered with German confectionery brand Haribo to release limited edition Ruby Hearts gummies, available only in Target.

== Live performances ==
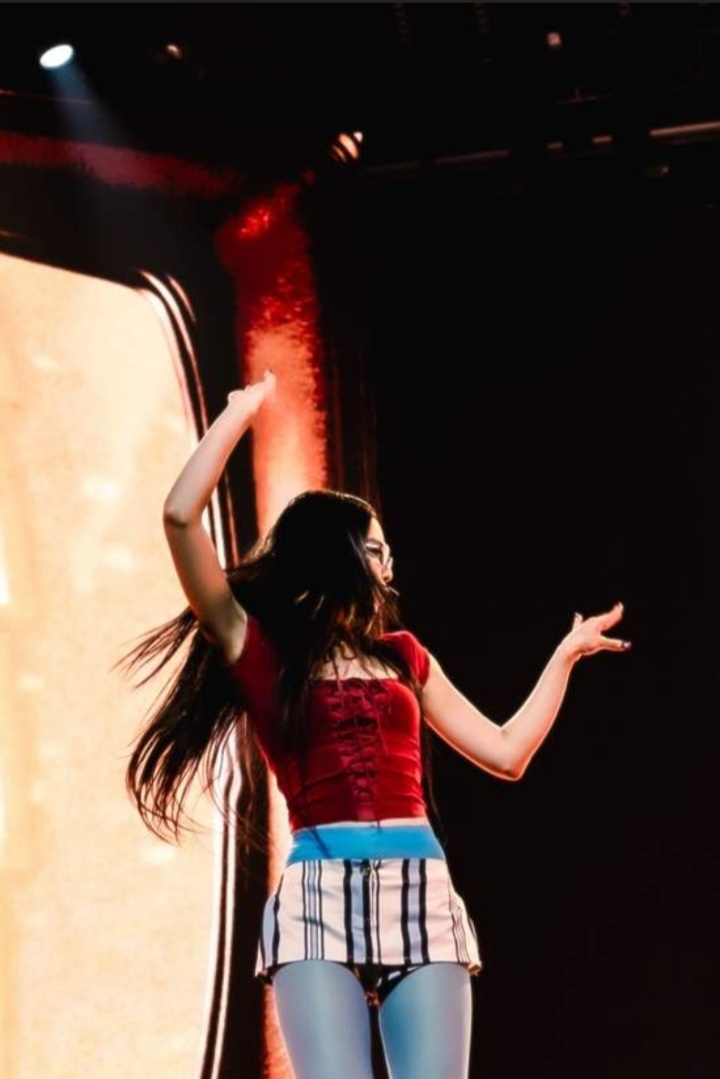
Jennie performing on the Ruby Experience in Incheon

Jennie promoted the album with performances, starting on the American late night talk show Jimmy Kimmel Live!, the South Korean music programs M Countdown and Show! Music Core, and the 2024 Superpop Japan music festival after the release of "Mantra". A live performance video of Ruby's next single "Love Hangover" was published on Jennie's official YouTube channel. After the album's release, Jennie recorded live performances of "Like Jennie" and "Handlebars" for Billboard's Iconic Stage as its first featured act. She performed songs from Ruby at the Coachella Valley Music and Arts Festival on April 13 and 20, 2025.

=== Tour ===
Jennie supported album sales with the Ruby Experience, a four-city run of five shows from March 6 to 21, 2025. Originally announced as a three-show series, the tour added shows in Los Angeles and Paris. It was praised by critics for its experimental and cinematic production.

== Critical reception ==
Professional ratings
Aggregate scores
Source	Rating
Metacritic	74/100
Review scores
Source	Rating
AllMusic	3.5/5 stars
Clash	9/10
IZM	4/5 stars
NME	4/5 stars
Pitchfork	7.1/10
Rolling Stone	3.5/5 stars

According to Forbes, Ruby was the most acclaimed K-pop album of 2025. According to the review aggregator Metacritic, Ruby received "generally favorable reviews" based on a weighted average score of 74 out of 100 from six critic scores. Wonderland, in July 2025, declared it the best solo album from a Blackpink member. Rolling Stone's Maura Johnston, in an entry for the called it a "fast-moving good time" with its "impressive ability to command" the R&B-pop genre. Elle similarly praised it as "loud, adventurous, and most of all, fun", with "confident anthems" and "exciting collabs", while Callie Alghrim of Business Insider also claimed the singer "easily commands the spotlight". Ruby was number 29 on Rolling Stone's top-100 list of the best albums of 2025, and number 56 on Clash's list of the same. Billboard ranked it the third-best K-pop album of 2025.

Several critics, even The New York Times's Jon Caramanica who was generally mixed towards Ruby, appreciated it as a showcase of Jennie's artistry and wide range when it came to her vocals and choice of genres and other sonics to experiment with. Some, such as Maria Sherman of the Associated Press, considered it bold and ambitious. Reviewers such as Vogue's Irene Kim argued the singer's solo effort allowed her to display traits different from her it girl character for Blackpink and those the K-pop industry forces its idols to put on. Reviews from Billboard and the official website for the Grammy awards claimed the combination of different styles highlighted her rise as a "global force" and "new-generation pop icon", "refusing to be confined by any expectations of genre, language, or manner".

== Accolades ==
Awards and nominations
Year	Organization	Award	Result	Ref.
2025	Asian Pop Music Awards	Top 20 Albums of the Year	Won	
2025	Asian Pop Music Awards	People's Choice Award	9th place	
2025	Asian Pop Music Awards	Best Album of the Year	Nominated	
2025	Asian Pop Music Awards	Best Producer (Note: Producers: Jennie (with her production team))	Nominated	
2025	Korea Grand Music Awards	Best Music 10	Nominated	
2025	Melon Music Awards	Millions Top 10	Won	
2025	Melon Music Awards	Album of the Year	Nominated	
2026	Golden Disc Awards	Best Album (Bonsang)	Nominated	
2026	iHeartRadio Music Awards	K-pop Album of the Year	Won	
2026	iHeartRadio Music Awards	Favorite Debut Album	Nominated	
2026	Korean Music Awards	Best K-pop Album	Won	
2026	Korean Music Awards	Album of the Year	Nominated	

== Commercial performance ==
On March 4, 2025, it was reported Ruby had amassed 450,000 pre-orders worldwide. The album sold more than one million copies in its first week of release and entered the top ten in 19 countries including South Korea, Australia, and the United States. In South Korea, the album sold more than 660,000 copies in its first week according to data from the Hanteo Chart, marking the highest first-week album sales for a K-pop female solo artist in 2025. It also debuted at number two on the Circle Album Chart, recording 595,900 copies sold in two days of tracking. In Australia, the album debuted at number two on the ARIA Albums Chart, behind Lady Gaga's Mayhem (2025). With this debut, Ruby tied bandmate Rosé's Rosie (2024) as the highest-charting album by a female K-pop soloist on the chart. The placement was Jennie's third top-two album in Australia after Blackpink's The Album (2020) and Born Pink (2022). In the United Kingdom, Ruby debuted at number three on the UK Albums Chart, surpassing Rosé's Rosie as the highest-charting album by a female K-pop soloist on the chart. She also tied Jung Kook's Golden (2023) for the highest-charting album by any K-pop solo artist. Jennie previously entered the top-two with Blackpink's albums The Album and Born Pink.

In the United States, Ruby debuted at number seven on the Billboard 200 with 56,000 album-equivalent units sold in its first week. Of that total, 26,500 were album sales, resulting in the album's debut in the second place on the Billboard Top Album Sales chart. It also achieved 29,000 streaming equivalent albums (from 39.93 million on-demand official streams), leading to a number 13 debut on the Billboard Top Streaming Albums chart, and 500 track equivalent albums. With this debut, Jennie became the third member of Blackpink to achieve a top-ten album in the US, after Rosé's Rosie and Lisa's Alter Ego (2025). Upon the album's release, three of its songs charted on the Billboard Hot 100 simultaneously, with "Handlebars" and "Like Jennie" debuting at number 80 and 83 respectively and "ExtraL" re-entering at number 99. This made Jennie the first K-pop female soloist to have three songs on the chart in the same week.

== Track listing ==
Standard track listing
No.	Title	Writer(s)	Producer(s)	Length
1.	"Intro: Jane" (with FKJ)	Jennie; Vincent Fenton	FKJ	1:38
2.	"Like Jennie"	Jennie; Tayla Parx; Amanda "Kiddo A.I." Ibanez; Zico; Thomas Pentz; Jorge Alfonso Sr.	Diplo; Leclair; Jorge; Chris O'Ryan^{[a]}	2:03
3.	"Start a War"	Jonas Jeberg; Rasmus Søegren; Jelli Dorman; Kuk Harrell	Jeberg; Sam Homaee; Søegren; Dorman^{[b]}; Harrell^{[a]}	2:45
4.	"Handlebars" (featuring Dua Lipa)	Lipa; Rob Bisel; Amy Allen; Brittany Amaradio; James Ghaleb	Bisel; Ido Zmishlany; Delacey^{[a]}; Dorman^{[a]}; Harrell^{[a]}; O'Ryan^{[a]}; Cameron Gower Poole^{[a]}	3:04
5.	"With the IE (Way Up)"	Jennie; Dwayne Abernathy Jr.; Dorman; Jose Fernando Arbex Miro	Dem Jointz	2:43
6.	"ExtraL" (featuring Doechii)	Jennie; Jaylah Hickmon; Alexis Andrea Boyd; Sorana Pacurar; Abernathy	Dem Jointz; O'Ryan^{[a]}	2:47
7.	"Mantra"	Jennie; Claudia Valentina; Elle Campbell; Zikai; Jumpa; Billy Walsh; Dorman; Serban Cazan	Jumpa; El Guincho; Cazan; Dorman; Harrell^{[a]}	2:16
8.	"Love Hangover" (featuring Dominic Fike)	Fike; Zmishlany; Megan Bülow; Blaise Railey; Carly Gibert; Devin Workman	Jennie; Zmishlany; Dorman^{[a]}; Harrell^{[a]}; Workman^{[a]}	3:00
9.	"Zen"	Jennie; Asheton Hogan; Bibi Bourelly; Kirsten Spencer; Dorman	Pluss; Dorman^{[a]}; Harrell^{[a]}	3:21
10.	"Damn Right" (featuring Childish Gambino and Kali Uchis)	Jennie; Donald Glover; Karly-Marina Loaiza; Jean Day Jr.; Samuel Gloade; Michael Williams II; Bourelly; Ariowa Irosogie	Trubeatzz; 30 Roc; Mike Will Made It; Dorman^{[a]}; Harrell^{[a]}	3:50
11.	"F.T.S."	Jennie; Hogan; Bourelly; Gibert; Christopher Newlin	Pluss; Gage; Dorman^{[a]}; Harrell^{[a]}	2:32
12.	"Filter"	Jennie; Boyd; Pacurar; Abernathy; Carmen Reece	Jennie; Dem Jointz	2:31
13.	"Seoul City"	Jennie; Myles Harris; Braylin Bowman; Xeryus Gittens; Williams; Bourelly; Gibert	MoneyGoForMyles; Resource; Xeryus; Mike Will Made It	2:44
14.	"Starlight"	Jennie; Hogan; Armel Potter; Williams; Bourelly; Irosogie	Pluss; Melz; Mike Will Made It	2:48
15.	"Twin"	Jennie; Bourelly; Newlin; Williams	Gage; Mike Will Made It	3:28
Total length:				41:30

The Complete Collection track listing
No.	Title	Writer(s)	Producer(s)	Length
1.	"Like Jennie" (extended remix; with Diplo and D00mscrvll)	Jennie; Parx; Ibanez; Zico; Pentz; Alfonso	Diplo; Leclair; Jorge; Akira Akira; William Bowerman; O'Ryan^{[a]}	3:00
2.	"Like Jennie" (EDM remix; with Natural)	Jennie; Parx; Ibanez; Zico; Pentz; Alfonso	Diplo; Leclair; Jorge; O'Ryan^{[a]}	2:39
3.	"Handlebars" (Just Jennie)	Bisel; Allen; Amaradio; Ghaleb	Bisel; Delacey^{[a]}; Dorman^{[a]}; Harrell^{[a]}; O'Ryan^{[a]}	2:14
4.	"ExtraL" (Just Jennie)	Jennie; Boyd; Pacurar; Abernathy	Dem Jointz	2:34
5.	"Love Hangover" (Just Jennie)	Zmishlany; Bülow; Railey; Gibert	Jennie; Zmishlany; Dorman^{[a]}; Harrell^{[a]}	2:48
6.	"Damn Right" (Just Jennie)	Jennie; Day; Gloade; Williams; Bourelly; Irosogie	Truebeatzz; 30 Roc; Mike Will Made-It; Dorman^{[a]}	2:23
Total length:				57:19

Notes

- ^{^[a]} signifies a vocal producer
- ^{^[b]} signifies a co-producer
- "Start a War" and "Twin" are stylized in lowercase
- CD and cassette editions of the album have an alternate track listing order, with Just Jennie versions of "Handlebars", "ExtraL", "Love Hangover", and "Damn Right" in place of the originals.
- On clean versions of the album, "F.T.S." is excluded from the tracklist.
- The Complete Collection places the original tracks after the six bonus tracks.
- "With the IE (Way Up)" contains a sample of "Hi-Jack", written by Jose Fernando Arbex Miro and performed by Barrabás.

== Personnel ==
Credits adapted from Tidal

=== Musicians ===
- Jennie – vocals (all tracks)
- FKJ – programming, synthesizer (track 1)
- Amanda "Kiddo A.I." Ibanez – background vocals (track 2)
- Chris O'Ryan – background vocals (track 2)
- Tayla Parx – background vocals (track 2)
- Jonas Jeberg – programming, all instruments (track 3)
- Ramus Søegren – programming, all instruments (track 3)
- Sam Homaee – programming, all instruments (track 3)
- Jelli Dorman – background vocals (tracks 3, 7, 9, 10), programming (track 8)
- Dua Lipa – vocals (track 4)
- Rob Bisel – programming, bass, glockenspiel, piano, synthesizer, background vocals (track 4)
- Aaron Sterling – drums, percussion (track 4)
- Shelby Epstine – glockenspiel (track 4)
- James Alan – piano (track 4)
- Amy Allen – background vocals (track 4)
- Delacey – background vocals (track 4)
- Doechii – vocals (track 6)
- El Guincho – programming, clapping, drums, keyboards, percussion, synth bass, synthesizer (track 7)
- Dominic Fike – vocals (track 8)
- Ido Zmishlany – programming, bass, clavichord, drums, keyboards, organ, background vocals (track 8)
- Will Lamoureux – violin, viola (track 8)
- Blaise Railey – background vocals (track 8)
- Carly Gibert – background vocals (track 8)
- Megan Bülow – background vocals (track 8)
- Childish Gambino – vocals (track 10)
- Kali Uchis – vocals (track 10)

=== Technical ===
- FKJ – mixing (track 1)
- Serban Ghenea – mixing (tracks 2–4, 6–8)
- Bryce Bordone – mixing assistance (tracks 2–4, 6–8)
- Manny Marroquin – mixing (tracks 5, 9, 12, 14)
- Jaycen Joshua – mixing (tracks 10, 11, 13, 15)
- Mike Seaberg – mixing (tracks 10, 11, 13, 15)
- Will Quennell – mastering (tracks 1–5, 7–15)
- Chris Gehringer – mastering (track 6)
- Eunkyung Jung – recording (tracks 2, 14, 15)
- Jonas Jeberg – recording (track 3)
- Ramus Søegren – recording (track 3)
- Cameron Poole – recording, vocal production (track 4)
- Delacey – recording, vocal production (track 4)
- Chris O'Ryan – vocal production (tracks 2, 4, 6), vocal engineering (6)
- Kuk Harrell – recording, vocal engineering, vocal production (tracks 3, 4, 7–10)
- Jelli Dorman – engineering (tracks 3, 4, 10, 11); vocal engineering, vocal production (tracks 3, 4, 7–10)
- Dem Jointz – recording (tracks 5, 6, 12), vocal production (tracks 5, 12)
- Jayda Love – recording (track 6)
- Devin Workman – recording, vocal engineering, vocal production (track 8)
- Gage – recording (tracks 11, 12, 14)
- Aaron Sterling – engineering (track 4)
- Jackson Card – engineering (track 4)
- Rob Bisel – engineering, recording (track 4)
- Jennifer Ortiz – engineering (track 6)
- Noah Gottdenker – engineering (track 8)
- Donald Glover – engineering (track 10)
- Morgan Jones – recording assistance (track 4)
- Ramiro Fernandez-Seoane – recording assistance (track 14)
- Anthony Vilchis – engineering assistance (track 5)
- Trey Station – engineering assistance (tracks 5, 14)
- Chris Bhikoo – engineering assistance (track 13)
- Jacob Richards – engineering assistance (track 13)

== Charts ==
=== Weekly charts ===
Weekly chart performance for Ruby
Chart (2025)	Peak position
Australian Albums (ARIA)	2
Austrian Albums (Ö3 Austria)	3
Belgian Albums (Ultratop Flanders)	3
Belgian Albums (Ultratop Wallonia)	4
Canadian Albums (Billboard)	6
Croatian International Albums (HDU)	18
Czech Albums (ČNS IFPI)	31
Danish Albums (Hitlisten)	36
Dutch Albums (Album Top 100)	5
Finnish Albums (Suomen virallinen lista)	16
French Albums (SNEP)	4
German Albums (Offizielle Top 100)	6
Hungarian Albums (MAHASZ)	18
Irish Albums (Official Charts)	16
Italian Albums (FIMI)	33
Japanese Albums (Oricon)	21
Japanese Combined Albums (Oricon)	17
Japanese Hot Albums (Billboard Japan)	9
Lithuanian Albums (AGATA)	8
New Zealand Albums (RMNZ)	2
Nigerian Albums (TurnTable)	49
Norwegian Albums (VG-lista)	12
Polish Albums (ZPAV)	4
Portuguese Albums (AFP)	3
Scottish Albums (Official Charts)	2
Slovak Albums (ČNS IFPI)	20
Spanish Albums (PROMUSICAE)	5
South Korean Albums (Circle)	2
South Korean Albums (Circle) LP version	10
Swedish Albums (Sverigetopplistan)	14
Swiss Albums (Schweizer Hitparade)	9
UK Albums (Official Charts)	3
US Billboard 200	7

=== Monthly charts ===
Monthly chart performance for Ruby
Chart (2025)	Position
Japanese Albums (Oricon)	43
South Korean Albums (Circle)	2
South Korean Albums (Circle) LP version	44

=== Year-end charts ===
Year-end chart performance for Ruby
Chart (2025)	Position
Australian Albums (ARIA)	60
Belgian Albums (Ultratop Flanders)	167
Belgian Albums (Ultratop Wallonia)	121
French Albums (SNEP)	85
Japanese Hot Albums (Billboard Japan)	36
New Zealand Albums (RMNZ)	41
South Korean Albums (Circle)	27
UK Cassette Albums (OCC)	9

== Certifications and sales ==
Certifications and sales for Ruby
Region	Certification	Certified units/sales
Brazil (Pro-Música Brasil)	Platinum	40,000^{‡}
France (SNEP)	Gold	50,000^{‡}
Japan	—	10,639
New Zealand (RMNZ)	Gold	7,500^{‡}
South Korea (KMCA)	3× Platinum	902,523
United Kingdom (BPI)	Silver	60,000^{‡}
United States (RIAA)	Gold	500,000^{‡}
^{‡} Sales+streaming figures based on certification alone.

== Release history ==
Release history
Region	Date	Formats	Label	Ref.
Various	March 7, 2025	CD; cassette; digital download; streaming	Odd Atelier; Columbia	
Various	August 22, 2025	LP	Odd Atelier; Columbia	

== See also ==
- List of certified albums in South Korea
- List of K-pop albums on the Billboard charts
- List of UK top-ten albums in 2025
