= Handlebars (Jennie song) =

Single by Jennie featuring Dua Lipa

from the album Ruby
- Released: March 11, 2025
- Studio: Paradise Sound Recordings (Los Angeles); Conway (Los Angeles); Ponzu (Los Angeles)
- Genre: R&B
- Length: 3:04
- Label: Odd Atelier; Columbia
- Songwriters: Dua Lipa; Rob Bisel; Amy Allen; Delacey; James Alan Ghaleb
- Producers: Rob Bisel; Ido Zmishlany

Jennie singles chronology
"Like Jennie" (2025)	"Handlebars" (2025)	"Dracula" (Jennie remix) (2026)

Dua Lipa singles chronology
"Illusion" (2024)	"Handlebars" (2025)	"End of an Era" (2025)

Music video
- "Handlebars" on YouTube

"Handlebars" is a song by South Korean singer and rapper Jennie featuring English singer Dua Lipa. It was released to US contemporary hit radio through Columbia Records on March 11, 2025, and to Italian radio by Sony Music Italy on March 14, as the fifth single from Jennie's debut studio album, Ruby (2025). The song was written by Lipa, Amy Allen, Delacey, James Alan Ghaleb and Rob Bisel and produced by the latter with Ido Zmishlany. It is a mid-tempo R&B track with lyrics about the reckless thrill of falling in love too quickly.

"Handlebars" received positive reviews from critics for its carefree vibe and the artists' chemistry. The song debuted at number 21 on the Billboard Global 200, while peaking within the top ten in Hong Kong, Malaysia, Singapore, Taiwan, and Thailand and at number 68 on South Korea's Circle Digital Chart. It also debuted at number 80 on the US Billboard Hot 100, Jennie's fifth consecutive single from Ruby to enter the chart.

An accompanying music video was directed by BRTHR and released on Jennie's YouTube channel on March 10. Set in a technicolor psychedelic-inspired world, the video shows the artists in a heart-shaped spider's web, symbolizing their entanglements in love. Jennie performed "Handlebars" on the Ruby Experience tour (2025), Billboard's Iconic Stage, the Coachella Valley Music and Arts Festival, and Blackpink's Deadline World Tour (2025–2026). The song received a nomination for the Ballad Award at the 34th Seoul Music Awards.

== Background and release ==
On January 21, Jennie officially announced the title of her debut solo album, Ruby and its release date of March 7, 2025. The announcement was accompanied by a teaser video revealing the list of featured artists on the record, which included Dua Lipa. Jennie had previously collaborated with Lipa as a member of Blackpink on the 2018 song "Kiss and Make Up."

Jennie revealed the album tracklist on February 18, which confirmed the duet's name was "Handlebars." On February 27, an album sampler video was released with snippets of "Handlebars" and other unreleased songs from Ruby. The day before the album's release, Jennie and Lipa teased the song by posting photos on Instagram of themselves posing together, with Dua Lipa wearing a crystal net dress. Ruby was released for digital download and streaming alongside the single "Like Jennie" on March 7, while "Handlebars" was included as the album's fourth track. The latter song was sent to US contemporary hit radio on March 11 and Italian radio on March 14, becoming the album's fifth single.

== Composition and lyrics ==
"Handlebars" was written by Dua Lipa, Delacey, Amy Allen, James Alan Ghaleb, and Rob Bisel. It has been described as a "mid-tempo," "chilled-out R&B track" with a "slinky, drum-driven instrumental" evoking the out-of-control beating of a heart in love. The song and its title compare falling in love to crashing a bike, with Jennie singing in the chorus: "I always go all in, all in, all in, / Over the handlebars / Hitting the ground so hard / If I'm alone, fallin', fallin', fallin'." In her first verse, she describes the song's core message regarding her frustration of giving in to love despite it hurting her previously: "Mercy / Why is it love is never kind to me? / I heard that fools rush in and, yeah, that's me / It burns me time and time again / So why am I still fixing for this frying pan." In the chorus, the duo belt "I trip and fall in love / Just like a Tuesday drunk," comparing their pursuit of love to getting tipsy on a weekday. The comparisons to alcohol continue throughout the song, with Lipa asking for "another round, another drink" before she gets "a little too buzzed on your love" in her verse.

== Critical reception ==
Writing for Billboard, Jeff Benjamin named "Handlebars" the 11th best song on Ruby and a "playful collaboration that feels like it captures the real-life fun and friendship between two pop powerhouses" and leaves listeners wanting more from the duo. Similarly, Joshua Minsoo Kim of Pitchfork praised how "the two trade verses here as if close friends, bonding over their tendency to crush hard" and used it as an example of Jennie's versatility. Clash's Letícia L. Gomes lauded the song as an "undeniably feel-good, summery anthem" and a "definite highlight" on the album, noting the undeniable chemistry between the artists. She argued that although the song doesn't push sonic boundaries, the song succeeds in its simplicity as an "effortless, confident, and infectious" track that could be put on repeat. NME's Crystal Bell described it as a "sultry tie-up", while Associated Press's Maria Sherman called it "perfect for TikTok". On the other hand, The New York Times's Jon Caramanica derided the song as a "listless duet".

== Accolades ==
Awards and nominations
Year	Organization	Award	Result	Ref.
2025	Asian Pop Music Awards	Best Collaboration	Nominated	
2025	Berlin Commercial Festival	Craft: Editing	Nominated	
2025	Seoul Music Awards	Ballad Award	Nominated	

== Music video ==
A scene in the music video of Jennie and Dua Lipa lying in a heart-shaped spider web signifies their entanglement in love.

An accompanying music video for "Handlebars" was directed by BRTHR and uploaded to Jennie's YouTube channel on March 10. The video depicts the two artists in a technicolor psychedelic-inspired fantasy world and opens with Jennie lying on a circular bed surrounded by TV screens. Wearing a glittery shirt over a metallic mini dress, she walks through a rainy neon alleyway and freezes the rain in place with a snap of her fingers. For most of the video, she lies on an electrified, heart-shaped spider's web, symbolizing her entanglement in love and desire. A glowing Dua transports in from another dimension and joins Jennie in lounging side-by-side in the spider web, which is located in a futuristic landscape filled with piles of glitchy monitors and colorful flashing lights. Near the end, the women shoot streams of shiny water from their eyes, which crash into each other and form a floating, fiery disco ball heart.

== Live performances ==
Jennie included "Handlebars" on the setlist of her concert tour, the Ruby Experience, which commenced in Los Angeles on March 6, 2025, at the same time as Ruby's release. She performed it for Billboard's Iconic Stage, which was uploaded to Billboard and Billboard Korea's official YouTube channels on March 12. Jennie also performed the song at the Coachella Valley Music and Arts Festival on April 13 and 20. Beginning on August 2, "Handlebars" was included on the setlist as part of Jennie's solo stage during Blackpink's Deadline World Tour. In 2026, she included the song in her headlining festival sets at ComplexCon Hong Kong on March 22, Governors Ball Music Festival on June 7, Roskilde Festival on July 3, Open'er Festival on July 4, Mad Cool on July 10, and Lollapalooza on August 1.

== Credits and personnel ==
Credits adapted from the liner notes of Ruby and Tidal.

Recording

- Recorded and engineered at Paradise Sound Recordings LA (Los Angeles, California), Conway Studios (Los Angeles, California), and Ponzu Studios (Los Angeles, California)
- Mixed at MixStar Studios (Virginia Beach, Virginia)
- Mastered at Sterling Sound (Edgewater, New Jersey)

Personnel

- Jennie – vocals
- Dua Lipa – featured vocals, songwriter (Dua Lipa version)
- Rob Bisel – songwriter, producer, background vocals, recording engineer, engineer, bass guitar, piano, synthesizer, drum programming, glockenspiel
- Amy Allen – songwriter, background vocals
- Delacey – songwriter, background vocals, recording engineer, vocal producer
- James Alan Ghaleb – songwriter
- Ido Zmishlany – producer (Dua Lipa version)
- Kuk Harrell – recording engineer, engineer, vocal producer
- Cameron Gower Poole – recording engineer (Dua Lipa version)
- Morgan Jones – assistant recording engineer (Dua Lipa version)
- Jelli Dorman – vocal producer, vocal engineer
- Jackson Card – engineer
- Aaron Stirling – engineer, drums, percussion
- Chris "Tek" O'Ryan – vocal producer
- James Alan – piano
- Shelby Epstine – glockenspiel
- Alex Ghenea – mix engineer
- Serban Ghenea – mix engineer (Dua Lipa version)
- Bryce Bordone – assistant mix engineer (Dua Lipa version)
- Will Quinnell – mastering engineer

== Charts ==
=== Weekly charts ===
Chart (2025)	Peak position
Australia (ARIA)	63
Canada Hot 100 (Billboard)	47
Central America Anglo Airplay (Monitor Latino)	11
China (TME Korean)	12
Colombia Anglo Airplay (Monitor Latino)	10
Croatia International Airplay (Top lista)	55
Dominican Republic Anglo Airplay (Monitor Latino)	16
France (SNEP)	134
Global 200 (Billboard)	21
Greece International (IFPI)	98
Hong Kong (Billboard)	6
Ireland (IRMA)	67
Japan Hot Shot Songs (Billboard Japan)	16
Lebanon English Airplay (Lebanese Top 20)	16
Lithuania Airplay (TopHit)	34
Malaysia (IFPI)	7
New Zealand Hot Singles (RMNZ)	3
Nicaragua Airplay (Monitor Latino)	7
Philippines (IFPI)	16
Portugal (AFP)	100
Singapore (RIAS)	5
South Korea (Circle)	68
Sweden Heatseeker (Sverigetopplistan)	2
Taiwan (Billboard)	4
Thailand (IFPI)	8
UK Singles (Official Charts)	41
US Billboard Hot 100	80
US Adult Pop Airplay (Billboard)	40
Vietnam (IFPI)	5

=== Monthly charts ===
Chart (2025)	Position
Lithuania Airplay (TopHit)	53
South Korea (Circle)	99

=== Year-end charts ===
Chart (2025)	Position
Philippines (Philippines Hot 100)	83

== Certifications ==
Certifications
Region	Certification	Certified units/sales
Brazil (Pro-Música Brasil)	Gold	20,000^{‡}
^{‡} Sales+streaming figures based on certification alone.

== Release history ==
Region	Date	Format	Label	Ref.
United States	March 11, 2025	Contemporary hit radio	Columbia	
Italy	March 14, 2025	Radio airplay	Sony Italy	
