= List of Jennie live performances =

List of live performances by South Korean singer Jennie

Jennie live performances
- Jennie at the 2026 Governors Ball Festival
- Concert tours: 1
- Music festivals: 10
- Award shows: 4
- TV shows and specials: 11
- Other live performances: 6

South Korean singer and rapper Jennie has performed in one solo concert tour. As a member of the South Korean girl group Blackpink since 2016, she has performed on several concert tours with the group. In March 2025, Jennie commenced her first solo concert tour, the Ruby Experience, which held 5 shows across North America, Asia, and Europe. She performed at the festivals Superpop Japan in 2024 and Coachella in 2025. Jennie embarked on a summer festival run in 2026 with shows in Asia, North America, and Europe, including ComplexCon Hong Kong, Governors Ball Music Festival, Roskilde Festival, Open'er Festival, Mad Cool, Lollapalooza, and Summer Sonic Festival, making history as the first K-pop solo artist to headline most of them.

== Concert tours ==
Title	Dates	Associated album(s)	Location(s)	Shows	Gross	Attendance	Ref.
The Ruby Experience	March 6, 2025 – March 21, 2025	Ruby	North America; Asia; Europe	5	$1,580,145 (1 show)	5,798 (1 show)	

== Music festivals ==
Event	Date	Venue	Location	Performed song(s)	Ref.
Superpop Japan	November 10, 2024	Panasonic Stadium Suita	Suita	"You & Me"; "Mantra"	
Camp Flog Gnaw Carnival (Note: Jennie appeared as a surprise guest performer during Matt Champion's set at the 2024 Camp Flog Gnaw Carnival.)	November 17, 2024	Dodger Stadium	Los Angeles	"Slow Motion" (with Matt Champion)	
Coachella	April 13, 2025 – April 20, 2025	Empire Polo Club	Indio	"Filter"; "Mantra"; "Handlebars"; "Start a War"; "Zen"; "F.T.S."; "Damn Right"; "Love Hangover"; "Seoul City"; "ExtraL"; "With the IE (Way Up)"; "Like Jennie"; "Starlight"	
ComplexCon Hong Kong	March 22, 2026	AsiaWorld–Expo	Hong Kong	"Mantra"; "Love Hangover"; "With the IE (Way Up)"; "Start a War"; "Seoul City"; "ExtraL"; "Handlebars"; "Dracula"; "Damn Right"; "Like Jennie"	
Governors Ball Music Festival	June 7, 2026	Flushing Meadows–Corona Park	New York City	"Filter"; "Damn Right"; "Mantra"; "Start a War"; "Handlebars"; "One of the Girls"; "Love Hangover"; "Dracula"; "Seoul City"; "F.T.S."; "Lockitdown"; "Heaven"; "ExtraL"; "With the IE (Way Up)"; "Starlight"; "Less Than a Lover"; "Like Jennie"	
Roskilde Festival	July 3, 2026	Roskilde Festivalpladsen	Roskilde	"Filter"; "Damn Right"; "Mantra"; "Start a War"; "Handlebars"; "One of the Girls"; "Love Hangover"; "Dracula"; "Seoul City"; "F.T.S."; "Lockitdown"; "Heaven"; "ExtraL"; "With the IE (Way Up)"; "Starlight"; "Less Than a Lover"; "Like Jennie"	
Open'er Festival	July 4, 2026	Gdynia-Kosakowo Airport	Gdynia	"Filter"; "Damn Right"; "Mantra"; "Start a War"; "Handlebars"; "One of the Girls"; "Love Hangover"; "Dracula"; "Seoul City"; "F.T.S."; "Lockitdown"; "Heaven"; "ExtraL"; "With the IE (Way Up)"; "Starlight"; "Less Than a Lover"; "Like Jennie"	
Mad Cool	July 9, 2026	Iberdrola Music	Madrid	"Filter"; "Damn Right"; "Mantra"; "Start a War"; "Handlebars"; "One of the Girls"; "Love Hangover"; "Dracula"; "Seoul City"; "F.T.S."; "Lockitdown"; "Heaven"; "ExtraL"; "With the IE (Way Up)"; "Starlight"; "Less Than a Lover"; "Like Jennie"	
Lollapalooza	August 1, 2026	Grant Park	Chicago	"Filter"; "Damn Right"; "Mantra"; "Start a War"; "Handlebars"; "Zen"; "Love Hangover"; "Dracula"; "Seoul City"; "Less Than a Lover"; "Sweettooth"; "Fallen Angel"; "Lockitdown"; "Heaven"; "ExtraL"; "With the IE (Way Up)"; "Starlight"; "Like Jennie"	
Summer Sonic Festival	August 14, 2026 – August 16, 2026	Zozo Marine Stadium; Makuhari Messe; Expo Commemoration Park	Chiba; Suita	"Filter"; "Damn Right"; "Mantra"; "Start a War"; "Handlebars"; "One of the Girls"; "Love Hangover"; "Dracula"; "Seoul City"; "Less Than a Lover"; "Sweettooth"; "Fallen Angel"; "Lockitdown"; "Heaven"; "ExtraL"; "With the IE (Way Up)"; "Starlight"; "Like Jennie"	

== Award shows ==
Event	Date	City	Performed song(s)	Ref.
33rd Golden Disc Awards	January 5, 2019	Seoul	"Solo"	
8th Gaon Chart Music Awards	January 23, 2019	Seoul	"Solo"	
2025 Melon Music Awards	December 20, 2025	Seoul	"Seoul City"; "Zen"; "Like Jennie"	
40th Golden Disc Awards	January 10, 2026	Taipei	"Filter"; "Damn Right"; "Like Jennie"	

== TV shows and specials ==
Event	Date	City	Performed song(s)	Ref.
Inkigayo	November 25, 2018	Seoul	"Solo"	
Show! Music Core	December 1, 2018	Seoul	"Solo"	
Inkigayo	December 2, 2018	Seoul	"Solo"	
Show! Music Core	December 8, 2018	Seoul	"Solo"	
Inkigayo	December 9, 2018	Seoul	"Solo"	
Show! Music Core	December 15, 2018	Seoul	"Solo"	
Inkigayo	December 16, 2018	Seoul	"Solo"	
The Seasons: Lee Hyo-ri's Red Carpet	January 5, 2024	Seoul	"You & Me"; "Miss Korea"	
Jimmy Kimmel Live!	October 15, 2024	Los Angeles	"Mantra"	
M Countdown	October 17, 2024	Seoul	"Mantra"	
Show! Music Core	October 19, 2024	Seoul	"Mantra"	

== Other live performances ==
Event	Date	City	Performed song(s)	Ref.
Chanel Pharrell Williams capsule collection launch event	March 28, 2019	Seoul	"Solo"; "Can't Take My Eyes Off You"	
Chanel 2022/23 Métiers d'art show	June 1, 2023	Tokyo	"Killing Me Softly with His Song"; "Fly Me to the Moon"; "You & Me"	
Zico Live: Join the Parade	November 24, 2024	Seoul	"Spot!" (with Zico)	
Chanel 2026 Métiers d'art show	May 26, 2026	Seoul	"Lockitdown"; "Handlebars"; "Like Jennie"	
Deadbeat Tour	July 29, 2026	Boston	"Dracula" (with Tame Impala)	
After Hours til Dawn Tour	October 8, 2026	Goyang	"One of the Girls" (with the Weeknd)	

== See also ==
- List of Blackpink live performances
