= Juno Awards of 2026 =

Canadian music awards ceremony

- The Juno Awards logo
- Date: March 29, 2026
- Location: TD Coliseum; Hamilton, Ontario
- Hosted by: Mae Martin

Highlights
- Most awards: Tate McRae (4)
- Most nominations: Tate McRae and Justin Bieber (6)
- Website: junoawards.ca

Television/radio coverage
- Network: CBC; CBC Gem
- Viewership: 2.6 million

The Juno Awards of 2026 were held on March 29, 2026, at TD Coliseum in Hamilton, Ontario, to honour achievements in Canadian music in 2025. The ceremony was hosted by comedian Mae Martin, making them the first comedian since Russell Peters in 2017 to host the ceremony.

Nominees were announced on January 27. Justin Bieber and Tate McRae were the most nominated artists, with six nominations each. McRae was the most awarded artist of the night, winning 4 out of the 6 awards she was nominated for, including Artist of the Year, Album of the Year, and Single of the Year. Meanwhile, The Beaches took home their third consecutive award for Group of the Year, the first for an all-women band. In addition, Daniel Caesar won Songwriter of the Year, Cirkut won Producer of the Year, Cameron Whitcomb won Breakthrough Artist or Group of the Year, and bbno$ won the Fan Choice Award.

== Ceremony ==
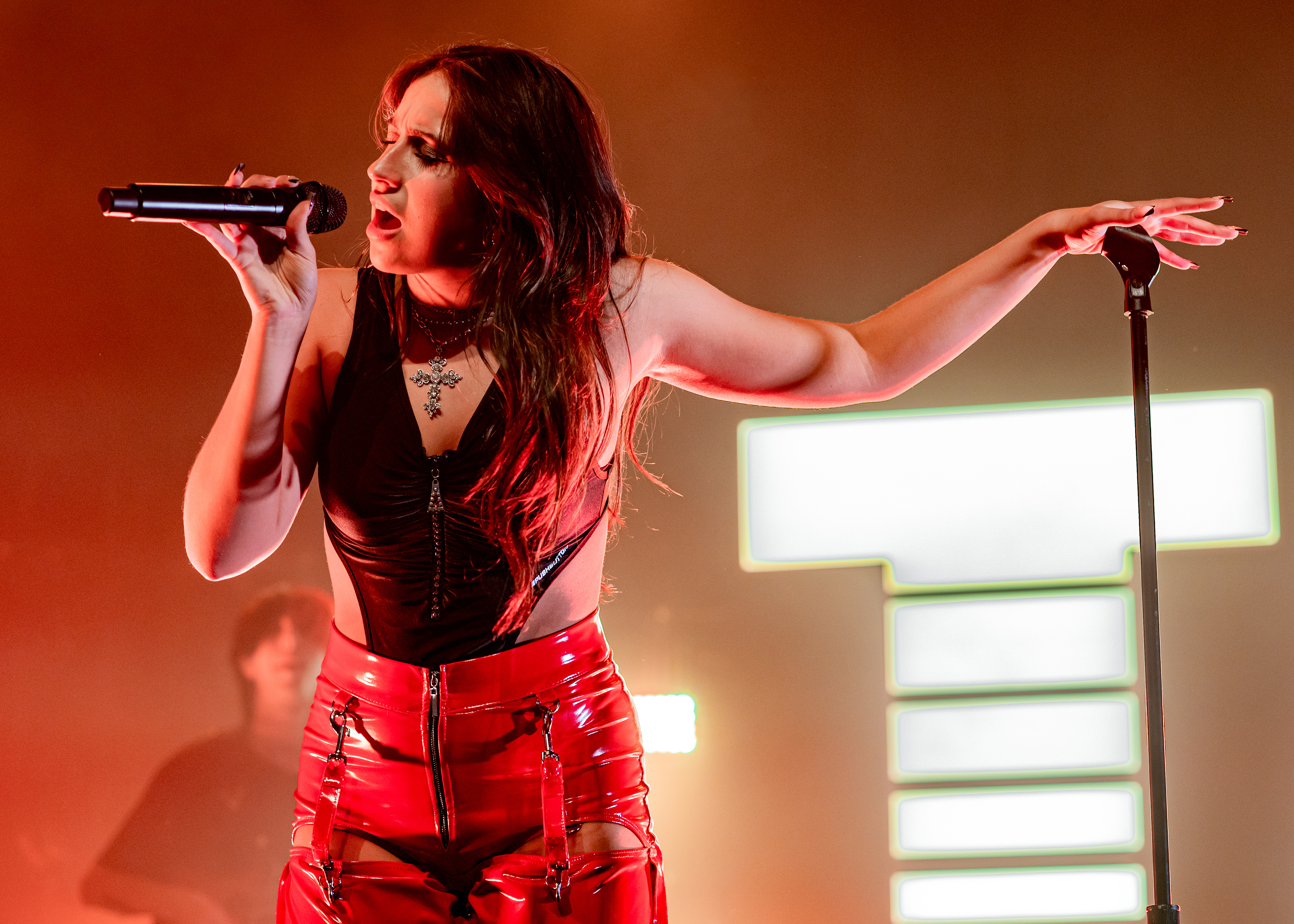
Singer Tate McRae won the most awards at the event

The majority of the awards were presented on March 28 during the Juno Awards Gala, which was co-hosted by Damhnait Doyle and Odario Williams and featured performances by Isabella Lovestory, Saya Gray, and Fredz. Williams also served as the announcer for the main ceremony.

During the ceremony, Furtado was paid tribute by Drake in a video message, who made his first appearance at the Juno Awards since 2011. In addition, Lifetime Achievement Award recipient Joni Mitchell was introduced by Prime Minister Mark Carney.

=== Special awards ===
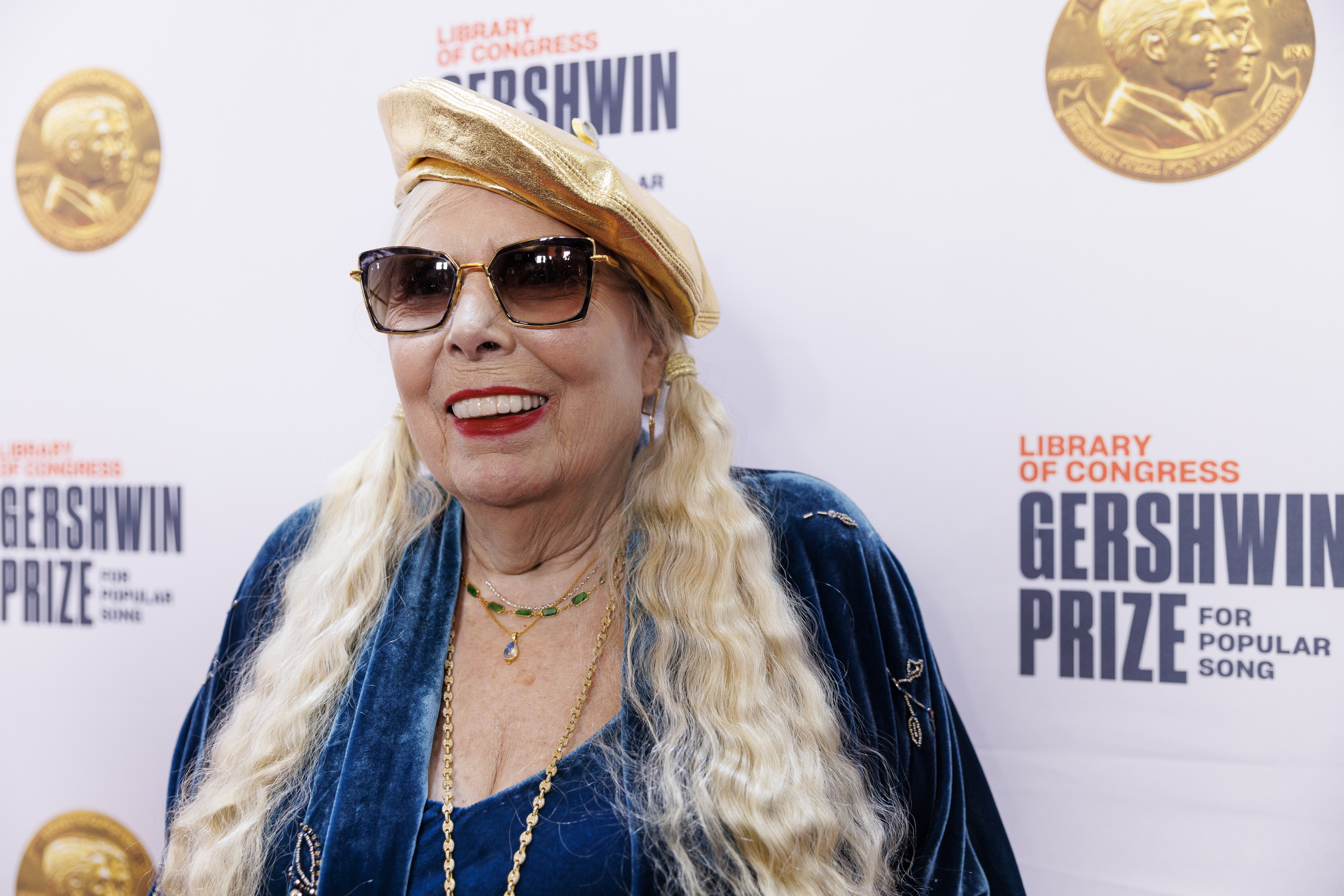
Joni Mitchell received the Lifetime Achievement award

Special award recipients included Joni Mitchell receiving the Lifetime Achievement award, and Daniel Caesar receiving the Juno International Achievement Award. The Walt Grealis Special Achievement Award was presented to Sandy Pandya of ArtHaus, Vinny Cinquemani of Paquin Entertainment and Alexander Mair of Attic Records, and rock band Billy Talent received the Juno Humanitarian Award.

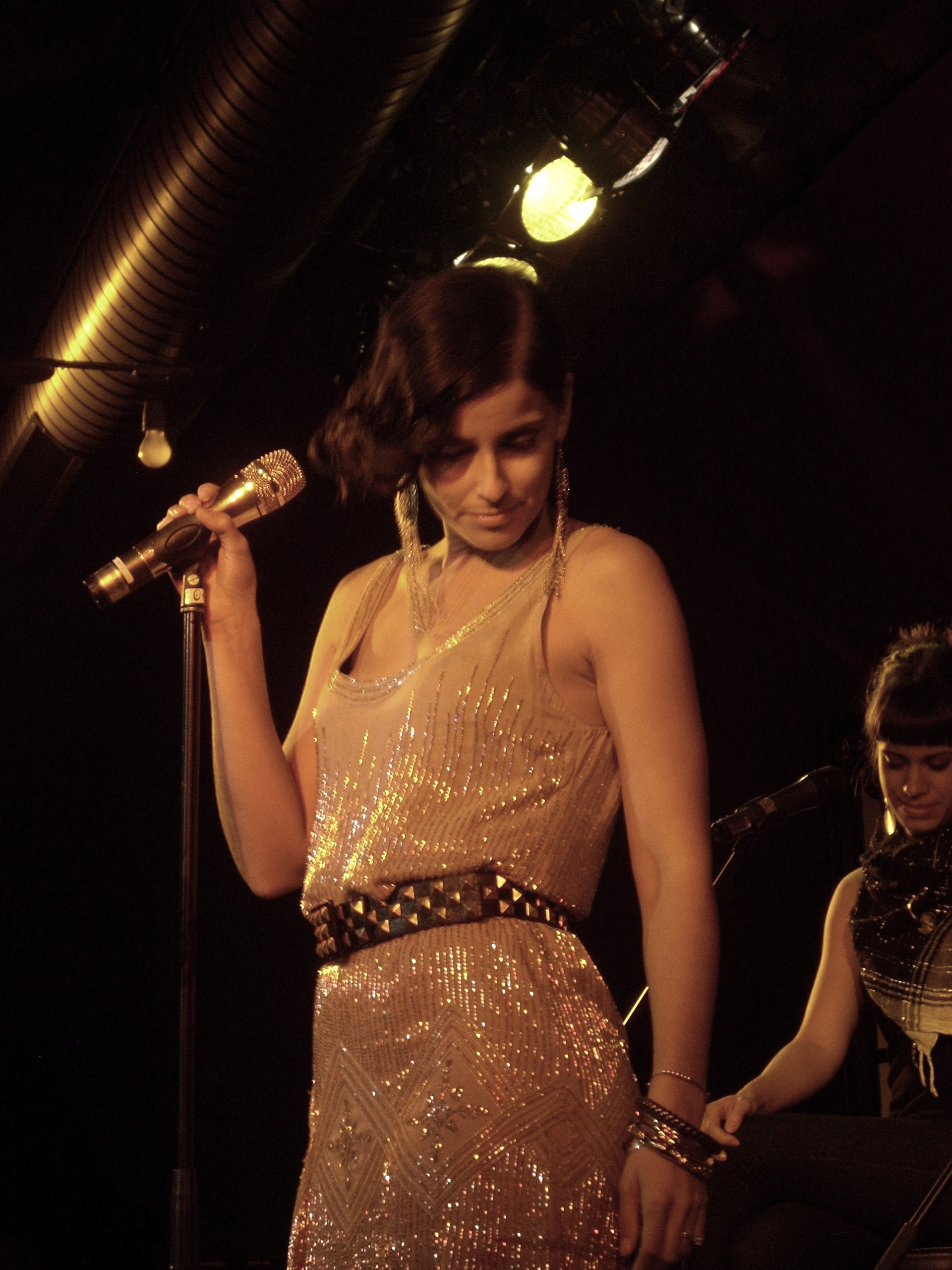
Nelly Furtado was inducted into the Canadian Music Hall of Fame

Singer-songwriter Nelly Furtado was inducted into the Canadian Music Hall of Fame.

=== Performers ===
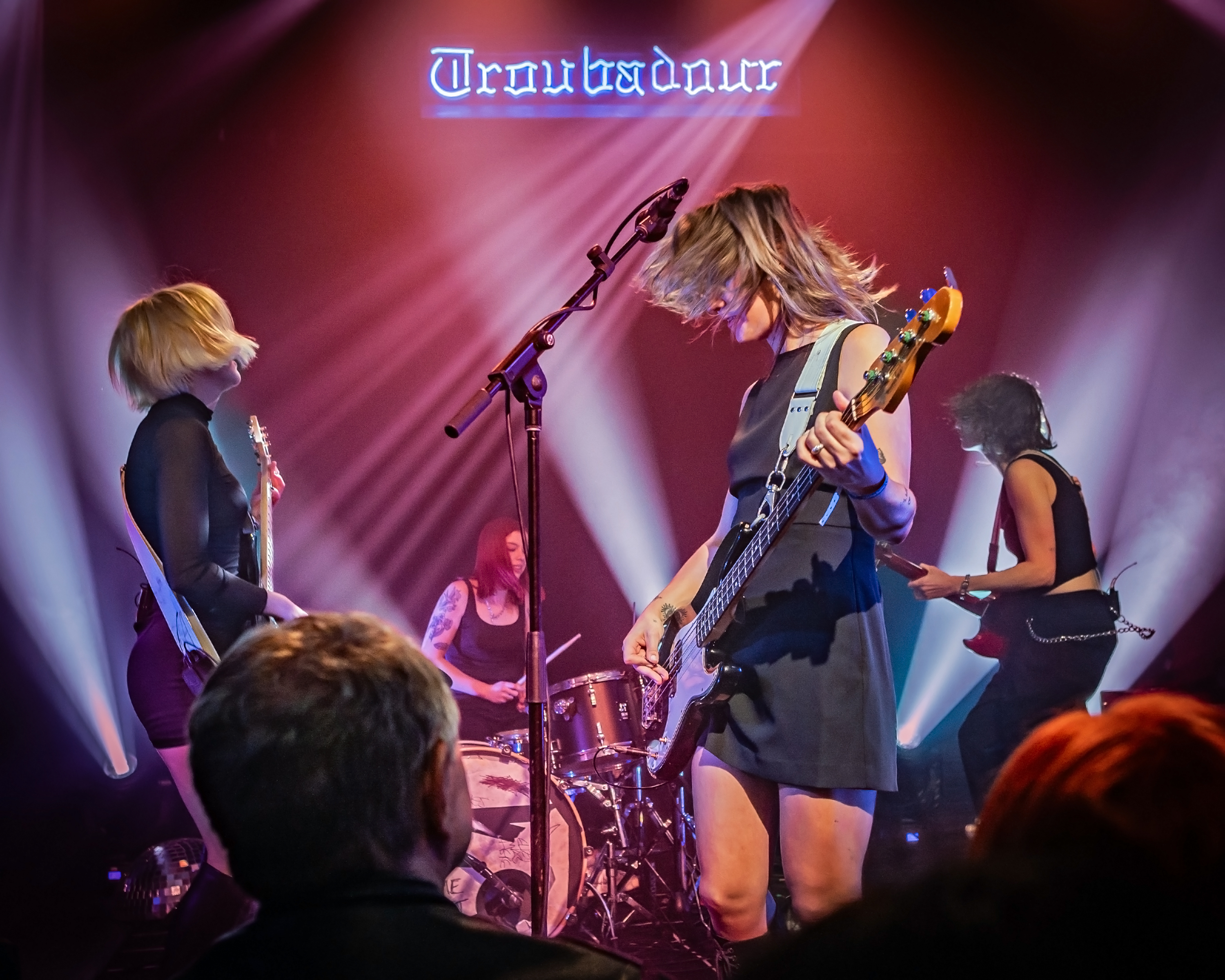
The Beaches performed and won Group of the Year

The first performers announced were Arkells (with Grouplove), The Beaches and William Prince.

Sarah McLachlan and Allison Russell performed a Mitchell tribute, consisting of the songs "A Case of You" and "Both Sides, Now", with Luke Doucet and Melissa McClelland performing as part of the backing band. The set transitioned into "Big Yellow Taxi", with Mitchell and Jully Black joining on some vocals.

A Furtado tribute set was performed by Alessia Cara, Jully Black, Shawn Desman and Tanya Tagaq. Special "surprise" guests for the Furtado performance, unnanounced in advance, were Lido Pimienta and Kardinal Offishall.

Other performers included MICO, Sofia Camara, Cameron Whitcomb and Daniel Caesar, as well as an unannounced performance by Rush, in their first-ever live performance with Anika Nilles on drums, to open the show.

=== Presenters ===
- Mustafa the Poet – presented International Achievement Award and introduced Daniel Caesar
- Renata Fast and Sarah Nurse – presented Group of the Year
- Billy Talent – presented Contemporary R&B/Soul Recording of the Year
- Arkells – presented MusiCounts Teacher of the Year
- Drake – introduced Nelly Furtado
- Begonia and Melanie Fiona – presented Breakthrough Artist or Group of the Year
- Majid Jordan – presented Fan Choice Award
- Mark Carney – presented Canadian Music Hall of Fame and introduced Joni Mitchell

== Winners and nominees ==
Source for winners and nominees at:

=== People ===
Artist of the Year	Group of the Year
Tate McRae; bbno$; Justin Bieber; Daniel Caesar; The Weeknd	The Beaches; Arcade Fire; Mother Mother; Peach Pit; Three Days Grace
Songwriter of the Year	Songwriter (Non-Performing) of the Year
Daniel Caesar — "Call On Me", "Moon", "Who Knows"; The Beaches — "Can I Call You in the Morning", "Did I Say Too Much", "Lesbian of the Year"; Justin Bieber — "Daisies", "Speed Demon", "Yukon"; Tate McRae — "Purple Lace Bra", "Revolving Door", "Sports Car"; Jessie Reyez — "Cudn't B Me", "Goliath", "Ocean"	Tobias Jesso Jr. — "La Yugular" (Rosalia), "Daisies" (Justin Bieber), "Man I Need" (Olivia Dean); Elizabeth Lowell Boland — "World's Smallest Violin" (Ava Max), "Girls Like You" (Sofia Camara), "Too Pretty for Buffalo" (Baby Nova); Nathan Ferraro — "After You" (David Guetta, Kiko & Olivier Giacomotto), "Girls Like You" (Sofia Camara), "Parking Lot" (Sofia Camara); Mustafa — "Rearrange My World" (Daniel Caesar and Rex Orange County), "Have a Baby With Me" (Daniel Caesar), "There's a Field (That's Only Yours)" (Daniel Caesar and Rex Orange County); Hayley Gene Penner — "Small Hands" (Teddy Swims), "West End Girl" (Lily Allen), "Woman of Faces" (Celeste)
Producer of the Year	Recording Engineer of the Year
Cirkut: "APT.", Rosé and Bruno Mars; "Abracadabra", Lady Gaga; "Disease", Lady Gaga; "A Little More", Ed Sheeran; "It Girl", Jade Thirlwall; "AEOMG", Coco Jones; Karen Kosowski: "Feels Like Christmas" and "Sugar Cookie", Mickey Guyton; "Blood from a Stone", "Stoned Alone", "Jessica" and "Jezebel", Meghan Patrick; "You Don't Know Me At All", Mickey Guyton; Joel Stouffer — "Body", Shawn Desman and Jamie Fine; "How to Sing for Money", Maggie Andrew; "Lie", Shawn Hook; "Revelation", The Knocks feat. Dragonette; "Talk About Me", Tedy; "Anyways How You Been?", Sofia Camara; Gus van Go — "Killed for Sport", Baby Nova; "Can I Call You in the Morning?", The Beaches; "Did I Say Too Much", The Beaches; "Last Girls at the Party", The Beaches; "Fine, Let’s Get Married", The Beaches; "Too Pretty for Buffalo", Baby Nova; Greg Wells — "Dancing Through Life", "Defying Gravity", "No One Mourns the Wicked", "Popular", "The Wizard and I" and "What Is This Feeling?", Ariana Grande, Cynthia Erivo and Wicked cast	Shawn Everett — "12 to 12", sombr; "End of the World", Miley Cyrus; John "Beetle" Bailey — "All I See", Molly Johnson feat. Cube; "Smoke 'Em If You Got 'Em", Monkey House; Jason Dufour — "Home (Phillip's Version)", Phillip Phillips; "Blue Sky Mystery", Finger Eleven feat. Filter; Serban Ghenea — "The Fate of Ophelia", Taylor Swift; "That's So True", Gracie Abrams; L. Stu Young - "Thus Is Why (I Don’t Spring for Love)", Saya Gray; "Lie Down", Saya Gray
Breakthrough Artist or Group of the Year	Fan Choice Award
Cameron Whitcomb; Goldie Boutilier; Sofia Camara; Saya Gray; Noeline Hofmann; Jutes; Jade LeMac; MICO; Sacha; yung kai	bbno$; Karan Aujla; Justin Bieber; James Barker Band; Tate McRae; Shawn Mendes; Josh Ross; Shubh; The Weeknd; Cameron Whitcomb

=== Albums ===
Album of the Year	Adult Alternative Album of the Year
Tate McRae, So Close to What; Justin Bieber, Swag II; Josh Ross, Later Tonight; The Weeknd, Hurry Up Tomorrow; Cameron Whitcomb, The Hard Way	Bahamas, My Second Last Album; Begonia, Fantasy Life; The Barr Brothers, Let It Hiss; Patrick Watson, Uh Oh; The Weather Station, Humanhood
Adult Contemporary Album of the Year	Alternative Album of the Year
Sarah McLachlan, Better Broken; Nuela Charles, NU2U; Rose Cousins, Conditions of Love Vol. 1; Shawn Hook, Rebuild; Sister Ray, Believer	Aysanabee, Edge of the Earth; Saya Gray, Saya; Yves Jarvis, All Cylinders; The OBGMs, Sorry, It's Over; PUP, Who Will Look After the Dogs?
Blues Album of the Year	Children's Album of the Year
Steve Marriner, Hear My Heart; Miss Emily, The Medicine; Secondhand Dreamcar, Answer the Call; Crystal Shawanda, Sing Pretty Blues; Kenny "Blues Boss" Wayne, Oooh Yeah!	Young Maestro, Maestro Fresh Wes Presents: Young Maestro Rhyme Travellers - Back to the Time Machine; Ari Cui Cui, Ari Cui Cui et les jeux d'rôles (Les contes classiques en musique); Ginalina, All the Earth Speaks; Hip Kids Music, Hip Kids Music Vol. 1; Chris McKhool, Little Leaf
Classical Album of the Year – Solo	Classical Album of the Year – Large Ensemble
Jan Lisiecki, Preludes by Chopin, Bach, Rachmaninoff, Messiaen, Górecki; Katherine Dowling, Awake and Dreaming; Haitham Haidar, Zaytoun; Bruce Liu, Tchaikovsky: The Seasons; Marie Nadeau-Tremblay, Obsession	Axios Men’s Ensemble, the Tenors and Basses of Pro Coro Canada conducted by Michael Zaugg featuring John Tessier and Yuliia Zasimova, Benedict Sheehan: Ukrainian War Requiem; Canadian Chamber Choir featuring Sherryl Sewepagaham, Where Waters Meet; Les Violons du Roy conducted by Airat Ichmouratov featuring Elvira Misbakhova and Stéphane Tétreault, Ichmouratov: The Ninth Wave, Viola Concerto No. 2, Cello Concerto No. 1; Tafelmusik conducted by Rachel Podger, Haydn: Symphony No. 43 in E-Flat Major, Hob. I:43 "Mercury" & Symphony No. 49 in F Minor, Hob. I:49 "La passione"; Toronto Symphony Orchestra conducted by Gustavo Gimeno, Stravinsky: Pulcinella, Le Baiser de la fée (Divertimento)
Classical Album of the Year – Small Ensemble	Comedy Album of the Year
Mariko Anraku, Conrad Chow, Ron Korb and Rachel Mercer, Kevin Lau: Kimiko's Pearl; CC Duo and collectif9, Re/String; Ensemble Caprice with Matthias Maute, Vivaldi Les Quatres Nations (reconstruites); Standing Wave Ensemble, in an archipelago; Timothy Long and the Continuum Ensemble, Current: Missing, ATOM (Artists of the Opera Missing)	Adam Christie, Dragonflies; Charlie Demers, Fish from the Jar; Robby Hoffman, I'm Nervous; Faris Hytiaa, Homesick; Dave Merheje, Dawud
Contemporary Indigenous Artist of the Year	Traditional Indigenous Artist of the Year
Aysanabee, Edge of the Earth; Sebastian Gaskin, Lovechild; Shawnee Kish, Chapter 1; Siibii, Siibii; Tia Wood, Sage My Soul	Bear Creek Singers, On the Move; Bad Eagle, Battle at the Beach; Manitou Mkwa Singers, Me & You; Piunguałaq, Anirniliit Suli; YB Nakota, Nakota Tayhunyabi
Contemporary Roots Album of the Year	Traditional Roots Album of the Year
Mariel Buckley, Strange Trip Ahead; Matt Andersen, The Hammer and the Rose; Noeline Hofmann, Purple Gas; William Prince, Further from the Country; The Young Novelists, These Dark Canyons	Morgan Toney, Heal the Divide; Aerialists, I Lost My Heart on Friday; Cassie and Maggie, Gold and Coal; Heather MacIsaac, The Moon's Daughter; The Southern Residents, Folk Signals
Contemporary Christian/Gospel Album of the Year	Country Album of the Year
Ryan Ofei, Jubilate; Bridge Music, Vulnerable Too; Collect.assembly, Outlaw Gospel; Kofi Dartey, Where the Heart Is; Elenee, The Light That Leads to You	Cameron Whitcomb, The Hard Way; James Barker Band, One of Us; Brett Kissel, Let Your Horses Run; Meghan Patrick, Golden Child; Josh Ross, Later Tonight
Electronic Album of the Year	Francophone Album of the Year
Èbony, Shades of Meridian; Cloverdale, Channel 303; Didon, Bab El Mdina; Debby Friday, The Starrr of the Queen Life; Korea Town Acid, Glow Up	Lou-Adriane Cassidy, Journal d'un loup-garou; Fredz, On s'enverra des fleurs; Pierre Lapointe, Dix chansons démodées pour ceux qui ont le cœur abîmé; Jean-François Pauzé, Les amours de seconde main; Ariane Roy, Dogue
Global Music Album of the Year	Instrumental Album of the Year
Kazdoura, Ghoyoum; Didon, Bab El Mdina; Kizaba, Future Village; PIQSIQ, Legends; Salin, Rammana	Aaron Paris, Lotusland; Viviane Audet, Le piano et le torrent; Jean-Michel Blais and Lara Somogyi, Désert (deluxe); Crown Lands, Ritual II; Colin Stetson, The Love It Took to Leave You
Jazz Album of the Year – Solo	Jazz Album of the Year – Group
Renee Rosnes, Crossing Paths; Anthony D'Alessandro, City Lights; Justin Gray, Immersed; Aretha Tillotson, Kinda Out West; Nancy Walker, Deeper Down	Winnipeg Jazz Orchestra, East Meets West: Connections; Alexis Baro y la Big Band, Afrokando; Code Quartet, Code Red; The Shuffle Demons, Are You Really Real; Steve Holt Jazz Impact Quintet, Impact
Vocal Jazz Album of the Year	Metal/Hard Music Album of the Year
Laura Anglade, Get Out of Town; Atlantic Jazz Collective, Seascape feat. Norma Winstone & Joe LaBarbera; Caity Gyorgy and Mark Limacher, Caity Gyorgy with Strings; Ale Nuñez, Under the Lemon Tree; Alex Samaras, Alex Samaras Meets Judy Garland	Despised Icon, Shadow Work; Counterparts, Heaven Let Them Die; Cryptopsy, An Insatiable Violence; Silverstein, Antibloom; Unreqvited, A Pathway to the Moon
Pop Album of the Year	Rap Album/EP of the Year
Tate McRae, So Close to What; bbno$, bbno$; Justin Bieber, Swag II; Nelly Furtado, 7; The Weeknd, Hurry Up Tomorrow	SadBoi, Dry Cry; Ardn, Keep Your Eye on the Sparrow; NorthSideBenji, Misery Loves Company; Connor Price, About Time; Tobi, Elements Vol. 2
Rock Album of the Year
The Beaches, No Hard Feelings; Bryan Adams, Roll with the Punches; The Blue Stones, Metro; The Damn Truth, The Damn Truth; grandson, Inertia; Three Days Grace, Alienation

=== Songs and recordings ===
Single of the Year	Classical Composition of the Year
Tate McRae, "Sports Car"; Justin Bieber, "Daisies"; Josh Ross, "Hate How You Look"; The Weeknd, "Cry for Me"; Cameron Whitcomb, "Options"	Amy Brandon, Cloud Path; Linda Catlin Smith, Linda Catlin Smith: The Complete Piano Solos (1989-2023) Vol. 1 - The Plains; Kevin Lau, Kevin Lau: Kimiko's Pearl; Nicole Lizée, Music for Body-Without-Organs; Andrew Staniland, The Laws of Nature
Dance Recording of the Year	Rap Single of the Year
Debby Friday, Bet on Me; A-Trak, Loving You; Anna Sofia, Do What I Want; Felix Cartal, I, Sabotage; Chyl, Dominate	Tobi, Saukrates and Jully Black, "Who's Driving You?"; Freddie Dredd, "Pursuit"; Nav feat. Playboi Carti, "Unlimited"; Connor Price feat. Big Sean, "Mula"; SonReal feat. Snotty Nose Rez Kids, "Dumb"
Contemporary R&B/Soul Recording of the Year	Traditional R&B/Soul Recording of the Year
Daniel Caesar, Son of Spergy; Avenoir, "Mirage"; Majid Jordan, Life 2; Adria Kain, "Set Me Free"; Jessie Reyez, Paid in Memories; SadBoi, Therapist	Melanie Fiona, "Say Yes"; Daniel Caesar, "Have a Baby (With Me)"; Tanika Charles, "Reasons to Stay"; Jessie Reyez, "Goliath"; Savannah Ré, "Formed"
Reggae Recording of the Year	Latin Music Recording of the Year
Naomi Cowan, "Welcome to Paradise"; Kirk Diamond, "Deh Yah"; Jojo You Made That, Yung 2nuff, Erin B, Topman Meeko, One Don & Enzooo, "Dagga Riddim Cypher"; Exco Levi and Kheilstone, "Ready for You"; Samora and Ammoye, "More Reggae (Funk It Up)"	Alex Cuba, Índole; Isabella Lovestory, Vanity; Lido Pimienta, La Belleza; Mario Puglia, He Sanado Varias Cosas; Andy Rubal, Baila y Confía
South Asian Music Recording of the Year	Underground Dance Single of the Year
Karan Aujla, P-Pop Culture; AP Dhillon and Anuv Jain, Afsos; Ikky and Raf Saperra, Renaissance; Shubh, Supreme; Sukha, By Any Means	Gene Tellem feat. Teddy Bryant, "Phantom Vibrations"; AADJA, "Cosmic Affliction (toi toi toi)"; Annie-Claude Deschênes, "Main de fer"; F7, "Icarus"; Pacific Coliseum, "Yeah!"

=== Other ===
Album Artwork of the Year	Video of the Year
Kevin Moore and Kyle Joinson — Tsunami Sea, Spiritbox; Jérôme Beaulieu, Etienne Bonneville, Chris de Muri and Alina Herta — Beat Bouquet, Misc; Catherine Lepage, Simon Rivest, Daniel Lanois, Norah Chassagne and Régine Chassagne — Pink Elephant, Arcade Fire; Logan Dane Morrison — The Hard Way, Cameron Whitcomb; Mykael Nelson, Nicolas Lemieux, Liliane Jodoin and Felipe Arriagada — Bambini Symphonique, Alain Trudel and Orchestre Symphonique de Montréal	Karena Evans, "Luther" (Kendrick Lamar and SZA); Winston Hacking, "Listen2me" (Foxwarren); Shiraz Higgins, "OK!" (Haviah Mighty); Adrian Villagomez, "Bellatores" (Apashe & Vladimir Cauchemar); Adrian Villagomez, "Driving" (Eddie Benjamin)
MusiCounts Teacher of the Year
Raquel McIntosh - Adelaide Hoodless Elementary School, Hamilton, ON; Zeda Ali - Sunny View Middle School, Brampton, ON; Lynn Harper - Chateauguay Valley Regional High School, Ormstown, QC; Alex Hutcheon - Cremona School, Cremona, AB; Isabelle Lemieux - École Caps-des-Neiges, Saint-Ferréol-les-Neiges, QC
