= Juno Award for Songwriter of the Year (Non-Performer) =

Canadian music award

The Juno Award for Songwriter of the Year (Non-Performer) is an annual Canadian music award, presented by the Juno Awards to honour work by Canadian songwriters. It was separated from the still-extant Songwriter of the Year to better allow the Junos to distinguish between songwriters who perform their own material as singer-songwriters or members of bands, and songwriters who wrote material for other artists.

The award is presented based on the Canadian nationality of the songwriter, and does not require the performing artist to be Canadian.

It was one of several new categories announced by the Juno Awards committee in fall 2024, and was presented for the first time at the Juno Awards of 2025.

== Winners and nominees ==
Year	Winner	Songs	Nominees	Ref.
2025	Lowell	"Texas Hold 'Em" (Beyoncé), "Bodyguard" (Beyoncé), "Takes One to Know One" (The Beaches)	Evan Blair — "Beautiful Things" (Benson Boone), "Pretty Slowly" (Benson Boone), "i hope i never fall in love" (Maren Morris); Nathan Ferraro — "Texas Hold 'Em" (Beyoncé), "Smoke" (Ari Lennox), "Who Do I Call Now? (Hellbent)" (Sofia Camara); Shaun Frank — "Love Somebody" (Morgan Wallen), "Training Season" (Dua Lipa), "Sideways" (Gordo); Tobias Jesso Jr. — "Houdini" (Dua Lipa), "push me over" (Maren Morris), "Come Show Me" (Camila Cabello)	
2026	Tobias Jesso Jr.	"La Yugular" (Rosalia), "Daisies" (Justin Bieber), "Man I Need" (Olivia Dean)	Elizabeth Lowell Boland — "World's Smallest Violin" (Ava Max), "Girls Like You" (Sofia Camara), "Too Pretty for Buffalo" (Baby Nova); Nathan Ferraro — "After You" (David Guetta, Kiko & Olivier Giacomotto), "Girls Like You" (Sofia Camara), "Parking Lot" (Sofia Camara); Mustafa — "Rearrange My World" (Daniel Caesar and Rex Orange County), "Have a Baby With Me" (Daniel Caesar), "There's a Field (That's Only Yours)" (Daniel Caesar and Rex Orange County); Hayley Gene Penner — "Small Hands" (Teddy Swims), "West End Girl" (Lily Allen), "Woman of Faces" (Celeste)	
