= Fallen Angel (Jennie EP) =

- Digital and standard cover

EP by Jennie
- Released: August 28, 2026
- Studios: Alo (Los Angeles); Pop Shop (Los Angeles); SIG Recordings (Seoul)
- Length: 8:50 (digital); 17:17 (physical)
- Labels: Odd Atelier; Columbia
- Producers: Daniel Aged; Cashmere Cat; Saya Gray; Dave Hamelin; Romil Hemnani; Sam Homaee; Finn Keane; Deb Never; Ojivolta; Tyler Spry

Jennie chronology
Ruby (2025)	Fallen Angel (2026)

Singles from Fallen Angel
- 1. "Less Than a Lover" Released: July 24, 2026; 2. "Fallen Angel" Released: August 28, 2026

Fallen Angel is the first extended play by South Korean singer and rapper Jennie. It was released on August 28, 2026, by Odd Atelier and Columbia Records. The digital edition of the EP contains three tracks, including the singles "Less Than a Lover" and "Fallen Angel", and the physical edition contains three additional exclusive bonus tracks.

== Background and release ==
In the summer of 2026, Jennie played several festival shows, beginning with the Governors Ball Music Festival on June 7, where she performed several unreleased songs. On July 20, Jennie announced that she would be releasing a new single "Less Than a Lover" on July 24. On August 19, Jennie's agency Odd Atelier revealed to South Korean media that Jennie would release a new extended play at the end of August. The following day, the singer posted several photos on her Instagram with the caption, "one day it'll all make sense." The photos showed Jennie posing in a red mini dress in front of a winged statue, creating the impression of wings on her back.

Jennie announced on August 20 that she would release the digital EP Fallen Angel on August 28, 2026, and revealed the tracklist, consisting of three of the songs from her festival performances. The announcement was accompanied by the EP's cover art, showing Jennie in a white dress against a flower field background with the title Fallen Angel arranged like a crown on her head. She also shared a teaser video of the music video for the title track the same day. Jennie announced the physical edition of Fallen Angel on August 23, featuring three additional tracks.

== Composition and lyrics ==
Odd Atelier described Fallen Angel as coming from "a very personal place with the truest self-expression" and as a "gift from Jennie, with love." The title track, "Fallen Angel", is a minimalist acoustic pop song led by a guitar melody that combines a clean sound with Jennie's vocals. The lyrics portray Jennie as a fallen angel seeking companionship and escape from reality with a romantic interest to save herself from succumbing to darkness. The second track, "Heaven", showcases soulful vocals over "rough and dreamy" guitar sounds and depicts an addictive relationship in which the couple repeatedly hurts each other while describing it as heaven. The third track, "Less Than a Lover", is an alternative pop ballad featuring restrained vocals over a lo-fi guitar and vintage electric keyboards. Lyrically, the song explores the dynamics of a casual, seasonal romance that falls between friendship and a committed relationship.

== Track listing ==
Digital track listing
No.	Title	Writer(s)	Producer(s)	Length
1.	"Fallen Angel"	Jennie; Daniel Aged; Deborah Jung; Romil Hemnani; Saya Gray; Jelli Dorman	Aged; Deb Never; Hemnani; Dorman^{[a]}	3:19
2.	"Heaven"	Jennie; Tyler Spry; Raul Cubina; Mark Williams; Dave Hamelin; James Essein; Dorman	Spry; Ojivolta; Hamelin^{[a]}; Dorman^{[a]}	3:06
3.	"Less Than a Lover"	Jennie; Spry; Magnus Høiberg; Jung; Bibi Bourelly; Dorman	Spry; Cashmere Cat	2:25
Total length:				8:50

Physical edition track listing
No.	Title	Writer(s)	Producer(s)	Length
1.	"Fallen Angel"	Jennie; Aged; Jung; Hemnani; Gray; Dorman	Aged; Deb Never; Hemnani; Dorman^{[a]}	3:19
2.	"Less Than a Lover"	Jennie; Spry; Høiberg; Jung; Bourelly; Dorman	Spry; Cashmere Cat	2:25
3.	"Sweettooth"	Jennie; Spry; Sam Homaee; Finn Keane; JBach; Dorman; Bourelly; Alexis Kesselman	Spry; Homaee; Keane	2:58
4.	"Lockitdown"	Jennie; Spry; Dorman; Bourelly	Spry	2:32
5.	"Face"	Jennie; Aged; Gray; Dorman; Livvi Franc	Aged; Gray	2:57
6.	"Heaven"	Jennie; Spry; Cubina; Williams; Hamelin; Essein; Dorman	Spry; Ojivolta; Hamelin^{[a]}; Dorman^{[a]}	3:06
Total length:				17:17

=== Notes ===
- ^{^[a]} signifies an additional producer

== Credits and personnel ==
All credits adapted from Tidal.

=== Musicians ===
- Jennie – vocals (all tracks)
- Daniel Aged – production, bass, programming, synthesizer (track 1)
- Romil Hemnani – production, guitar, programming, synthesizer (track 1)
- Deb Never – production, background vocals, guitar (track 1)
- Jelli Dorman – background vocals, vocal production (all tracks); additional production (tracks 1, 2)
- Tyler Spry – production, background vocals, bass, guitar, programming (tracks 2, 3); keyboards (track 2); percussion, synthesizer, Wurlitzer piano (track 3)
- Raul Cubina – production, background vocals, keyboards, programming (track 2)
- Mark Williams – production (track 2)
- Dave Hamelin – additional production, guitar, synthesizer (track 2)
- Ben Barter – drums (track 2)
- Loren Ferard – guitar (tracks 2, 3)
- Cashmere Cat – production, programming (track 3)
- Joe Henderson – keyboards, programming (track 3)
- Bibi Bourelly – background vocals (track 3)

=== Technical ===
- Dale Becker – mastering (all tracks)
- Mark "Spike" Stent – mixing (track 1)
- Jon Castelli – mixing (track 2)
- Serban Ghenea – mixing (track 3)
- Adam Burt – mastering assistance (tracks 1, 2)
- Katie Harvey – mastering assistance (track 1)
- Noah McCorkle – mastering assistance (track 2)
- Kieran Scott – mixing assistance (track 1)
- Brad Lauchert – mixing assistance (track 1)
- Bryce Bordone – mixing assistance (track 3)
- Jelli Dorman – vocal engineering (all tracks)
- Paniz Farokhnia – recording engineering (all tracks)
- Raul Cubina – recording engineering (track 2)
- Tyler Spry – recording engineering (tracks 2, 3)
- Joe Henderson – recording assistance (tracks 2, 3)

== Charts ==
Chart performance for Fallen Angel
Chart (2026)	Peak position
Austrian Albums (Ö3 Austria)	32
Belgian Albums (Ultratop Flanders)	59
Belgian Albums (Ultratop Wallonia)	76
French Albums (SNEP)	158
Hungarian Physical Albums (MAHASZ)	14
Japanese Albums (Oricon)	56
Japanese Top Albums Sales (Billboard Japan)	49
Scottish Albums (Official Charts)	92
South Korean Albums (Circle)	6
Swiss Albums (Schweizer Hitparade)	30
UK Albums Sales (OCC)	97
US Top Album Sales (Billboard)	17

== Release history ==
Release history
Region	Date	Formats	Label	Ref.
Various	August 28, 2026	Digital download; streaming	Odd Atelier; Columbia	
Various	October 30, 2026	CD	Odd Atelier; Columbia	
South Korea	November 13, 2026	CD	Odd Atelier; Columbia	
Various	January 29, 2027	LP	Odd Atelier; Columbia	
