= Fallen Angel (Jennie song) =

2026 single by Jennie

Single by Jennie

from the EP Fallen Angel
- Released: August 28, 2026
- Studio: Alo (Los Angeles); SIG Recordings (Seoul)
- Genre: Acoustic pop
- Length: 3:19
- Label: Odd Atelier; Columbia
- Songwriters: Jennie; Daniel Aged; Deb Never; Romil Hemnani; Jelli Dorman; Saya Gray
- Producers: Daniel Aged; Deb Never; Romil Hemnani

Jennie singles chronology
"Less Than a Lover" (2026)	"Fallen Angel" (2026)	"Someone to Hold" (2026)

Music video
- "Fallen Angel" on YouTube

"Fallen Angel" is a song by South Korean singer and rapper Jennie. It was released through Odd Atelier and Columbia Records on August 28, 2026, as the second single from her first extended play of the same name. The song was written by Jennie with Daniel Aged, Deb Never, Romil Hemnani, Jelli Dorman, and Saya Gray, with the former three handling the production. It is a minimalist acoustic pop song led by a guitar melody with lyrics portraying Jennie as a "fallen angel" yearning for companionship and escape from her reality.

"Fallen Angel" reached the top ten in Hong Kong, Singapore, Taiwan, and Vietnam and the top fifteen in Malaysia and Thailand, as well as number 42 on South Korea's Circle Digital Chart. An accompanying music video was directed by Sunburnkids and released on Jennie's YouTube channel simultaneously with the single's release. The video depicts the singer in a surreal, dark-fairytale world filled with fantastical imagery, where she confronts her younger self and searches for freedom. Jennie promoted the single with performances at Lollapalooza and Summer Sonic Festival.

== Background and release ==
On August 20, Jennie posted several photos on her Instagram of herself in a red mini dress in front of a winged statue with the caption, "one day it'll all make sense." She subsequently announced she would release the digital EP Fallen Angel on August 28, 2026, including the title track of the same name. She shared a teaser video for the title track's music video the same day. The fairytale-like teaser began with narration followed by a rapid interplay of various scenes and a snippet of the track as Jennie gazed at the camera. "Fallen Angel" marked the EP's title track and the continuation of its rollout following the lead single "Less Than a Lover".

== Composition and lyrics ==
"Fallen Angel" is a minimalist acoustic pop song led by a guitar melody that combines a clean sound with Jennie's vocals. Lyrically, the song portrays Jennie who desperately seeks companionship and dreams of a romantic interest saving her from the confines of her reality. However, without the promise of being saved by a suitor, she becomes a "fallen angel" who succumbs to darkness. Jennie sings that "Without you, these wings are of no use / Been searching, searching for you / Don’t leave a fallen angel out here on her own," expressing that she considers giving up her wings if she can't be with the object of her desire.

== Music video ==
A scene in the music video of children in red veils holding candles by a burning structure, which some argued evoked human sacrifice.

An accompanying music video for "Fallen Angel" was directed by Sunburnkids and released alongside the single. Described as a "dark fairytale" reminiscent to the work of Tim Burton, it depicts Jennie in a surreal, ethereal landscape that reflects the imagery in the lyrics. The video captures the inner self hidden behind Jennie's glamorous exterior and shows her confronting her true identity and feeling freedom while searching for a new self. It opens with a child enclosed on a stage of warped anthropomorphic houses and skyscrapers with eyes. A narrator expresses in Korean that "human greed has made them grow so heavy" and encourages the child to close their eyes and find freedom. Jennie is then shown floating above a lake decorated with white swans before slipping beneath the surface, which Elle interpreted as a reference to Ophelia. She reappears in a room with walls filled with garden vines and emerges in an open field of grass with red butterflies.

The video then shows a group of young children dressed in white robes and wearing red veils holding candles. It turns sinister as Jennie is led by a child with angel wings to a structure engulfed in flames, where she discovers herself and her younger counterpart dressed in red in a cocoon made of thorns. The clip concludes with a spoken-word narration explaining that despite being the "sharpest, fiercest thing on this earth", thorns "bloom into the world’s most beautiful roses". The fire effects were created using visual effects, while scenes involving minors were filmed under supervision. Some fans argued that the final scenes evoked religious rituals or a cult-like atmosphere. In particular, they criticized the staging, with children in red veils holding candles by a burning structure, for bringing to mind human sacrifice.

== Live performances ==
Jennie first debuted "Fallen Angel" live before its release at Lollapalooza on August 1, 2026.

== Credits and personnel ==
Credits adapted from the liner notes of Fallen Angel.

Recording

- Recorded at Alo Studios (Los Angeles, California) and SIG Recordings (Seoul, South Korea)
- Mixed at SLS (London, United Kingdom)
- Mastered at Becker Mastering (Pasadena, California)

Personnel

- Jennie – vocals, songwriter
- Daniel Aged – songwriter, producer, base, programmer, synthesizer
- Deb Never – songwriter, producer, background vocals, guitar
- Romil Hemnani – songwriter, producer, guitar, programmer, synthesizer
- Jelli Dorman – songwriter, additional producer, background vocals, vocal producer, vocal engineer
- Saya Gray – songwriter
- Mark "Spike" Stent – mix engineer
- Kieran Scott – assistant mix engineer
- Dale Becker – mastering engineer
- Adam Burt – assistant mastering engineer
- Katie Harvey – assistant mastering engineer
- Paniz Farokhnia – recording engineer

== Charts ==
=== Weekly charts ===
Weekly chart performance
Chart (2026)	Peak position
China (TME Korean)	5
Global 200 (Billboard)	117
Hong Kong (Billboard)	6
Malaysia (IFPI)	11
Malaysia International (RIM)	6
New Zealand Hot Singles (RMNZ)	5
Singapore (RIAS)	5
South Korea (Circle)	42
Taiwan (Billboard)	2
Thailand (Billboard)	14
Vietnam (IFPI)	8
Vietnam Hot 100 (Billboard)	18

=== Monthly charts ===
Monthly chart performance
Chart (2026)	Peak position
South Korea (Circle)	79

== Release history ==
Release dates and formats for "Fallen Angel"
Region	Date	Format	Label	Ref.
Various	August 28, 2026	Digital download; streaming	Odd Atelier; Columbia	

== See also ==
- List of K-pop songs on the Billboard charts
