= Less Than a Lover =

2026 single by Jennie

Single by Jennie

from the EP Fallen Angel
- Released: July 24, 2026
- Studio: Alo (Los Angeles); Pop Shop (Los Angeles); SIG Recordings (Seoul)
- Genre: Alternative pop
- Length: 2:25
- Label: Odd Atelier; Columbia
- Songwriters: Jennie; Tyler Spry; Magnus Høiberg; Deborah Jung; Bibi Bourelly; Jelli Dorman
- Producers: Tyler Spry; Cashmere Cat

Jennie singles chronology
"Dracula" (Jennie remix) (2026)	"Less Than a Lover" (2026)	"Fallen Angel" (2026)

Music video
- "Less Than a Lover" on YouTube

"Less Than a Lover" is a song by South Korean singer and rapper Jennie. It was released through Odd Atelier and Columbia Records on July 24, 2026, as the lead single from her first extended play, Fallen Angel (2026). Jennie wrote the song alongside Tyler Spry, Cashmere Cat, Deborah Jung, Bibi Bourelly and Jelli Dorman, with the former two handling the production. It is an alternative pop ballad featuring restrained vocals over a lo-fi guitar and vintage electric keyboards, with lyrics about a casual, seasonal romance.

"Less Than a Lover" topped charts in Hong Kong and Taiwan and reached the top ten in Malaysia, Singapore, Thailand, and Vietnam. It also peaked at number 17 on South Korea's Circle Digital Chart and number 29 on the Billboard Global 200. An accompanying music video was directed by Choeey and released on Jennie's YouTube channel simultaneously with the single's release. Filmed in Girona, Spain, the video incorporates a cinematic narrative structure and depicts the singer in a summer romance with Taiwan-born model Nah Kai. Jennie promoted the single with performances at the Governors Ball Music Festival, Roskilde Festival, Open'er Festival, Mad Cool, Lollapalooza, and Summer Sonic Festival.

== Background and release ==
On July 18, Jennie posted a Polaroid photo on social media of herself wearing a bright floral dress and leaning on a man's shoulder, with the man's face obscured by a heart emoji. Fans speculated that the man in the photo was Taiwanese model Nah Kai. Shortly afterwards, she announced the single "Less Than a Lover" with a romantic teaser showing the silhouettes of a couple under an arched tunnel in a European alley. The poster credited Jennie as the project's director, writer, and music producer and was captioned "The summer I chose to pause the love story." On July 20, she confirmed the single's release date with a second teaser image depicting Jennie outside a pickup truck with a man, revealed to be Nah Kai. A third teaser on July 20 showed the two running hand in hand through an open field. "Less than a Lover" is the first single from Jennie's first extended play, Fallen Angel (2026).

== Composition and lyrics ==
"Less than a Lover" is a "softer, more introspective" alternative pop ballad featuring restrained vocals over a lo-fi guitar, vintage electric keyboards and "dreamy, laid-back" instrumentation. Jennie was creatively involved throughout the entire project and participated in the song's lyrics, musical production, and music video direction. Lyrically, the song explores the dynamics of a casual, seasonal romance that falls between friendship and a committed relationship. Through lines such as "More than a friend, but less than a lover" the singer establishes clear boundaries, expressing a desire for a low-pressure, temporary connection. The track marked a stylistic departure from the singer's previous performance-oriented releases.

== Accolades ==
Awards and nominations
Year	Organization	Award	Result	Ref.
2026	MAMA Awards	Best Vocal Performance Solo	Pending	

Music program awards
Program	Date	Ref.
M Countdown	July 30, 2026	
M Countdown	August 6, 2026	

== Music video ==
Directed by Choeey, the song's music video was filmed in Girona, Spain and incorporates a cinematic narrative structure, with Jennie credited as both writer and narrator. The visual also stars the Taiwan-born model Nah Kai. Shot with a muted color palette and intimate camera angles, the visual begins with a spoken intro outlining a script about avoiding long-term romantic responsibility: "So I want a film about a girl. She wants to avoid love, wants to avoid responsibilities. She’s very confused, but also knows what she wants - just to enjoy summer." The narrative follows a summer romance through scenes of road trips, coastal drives, and poolside moments. The video ends with a scene on the beach described through a short voiceover. Just as the two characters are about to kiss, Jennie backs away, choosing to keep the relationship casual.

== Live performances ==
Jennie first debuted "Less Than a Lover" live before its release at the Governors Ball Music Festival on June 7, 2026. She further performed it at the Roskilde Festival on July 3, the Open'er Festival on July 4, and Mad Cool on July 9. Following the song's release, she performed it at Lollapalooza on August 1.

== Credits and personnel ==
Credits adapted from the liner notes of Fallen Angel.

Recording

- Recorded at Alo Studios (Los Angeles, California), Pop Shop (Los Angeles, California), and SIG Recordings (Seoul, South Korea)
- Mixed at MixStar Studios (Virginia Beach, Virginia)
- Mastered at Becker Mastering (Pasadena, California)

Personnel

- Jennie – vocals, songwriter
- Tyler Spry – songwriter, producer, bass, guitar, percussion, programming, synthesizer, Wurlitzer piano, background vocals, recording engineer
- Cashmere Cat – songwriter, producer, programming
- Bibi Bourelly – songwriter, background vocals
- Deb Never – songwriter
- Jelli Dorman – songwriter, background vocals, vocal producer, vocal engineer
- Loren Fernard – guitar
- Joe Henderson – additional programming, additional keyboard, assistant recording engineer
- Serban Ghenea – mix engineer
- Bryce Bordon – assistant mix engineer
- Dale Becker – mastering engineer
- Katie Harvey – assistant mastering engineer
- Paniz Farokhnia – recording engineer

== Charts ==
=== Weekly charts ===
Weekly chart performance for "Less Than a Lover"
Chart (2026)	Peak position
Australia (ARIA)	64
Bolivia Anglo Airplay (Monitor Latino)	8
Canada Hot 100 (Billboard)	82
China (TME Korean)	1
Global 200 (Billboard)	26
Hong Kong (Billboard)	1
Japan Hot 100 (Billboard)	60
Malaysia (IFPI)	3
Malaysia International (RIM)	2
New Zealand Hot Singles (RMNZ)	5
Philippines Hot 100 (Billboard Philippines)	19
Singapore (RIAS)	2
South Korea (Circle)	17
Taiwan (Billboard)	1
Thailand (Billboard)	5
Thailand (IFPI)	10
UK Singles Sales (Official Charts)	49
UK Video Streaming (Official Charts)	71
US Bubbling Under Hot 100 (Billboard)	7
Vietnam (IFPI)	5
Vietnam Hot 100 (Billboard)	8

=== Monthly charts ===
Monthly chart performance for "Less Than a Lover"
Chart (2026)	Peak position
South Korea (Circle)	18

== Release history ==
Release dates and formats for "Less Than a Lover"
Region	Date	Format	Label	Ref.
Various	July 24, 2026	Digital download; streaming	Odd Atelier; Columbia	
Italy	July 31, 2026	Radio airplay	Sony Italy	

== See also ==
- List of K-pop songs on the Billboard charts
- List of M Countdown Chart winners (2026)
