= Noeline Hofmann =

Canadian country and western singer-songwriter

Background information
- Born: July 30, 2003 (age 23); Bow Island, Alberta, Canada
- Genres: Country; Americana; traditional country; Western
- Occupations: Singer; songwriter
- Instruments: Guitar; vocals
- Years active: 2023–present
- Labels: La Honda; Mercury
- Website: Official website

Noeline Hofmann is a Canadian singer-songwriter from Bow Island, Alberta. She gained popularity for writing the song "Purple Gas" and collaborating with Zach Bryan to record it in 2024. She was previously signed to La Honda Records, but currently releases music through Mercury Records.

== Early life ==
Hofmann grew up in Bow Island in the Alberta Badlands. Her parents have worked as crop dusters, while she descends from a family of farmers. Hofmann cites fellow Canadians Corb Lund and Colter Wall as artists she listened to in her youth. She took piano lessons at a young age, and also wrote poems as a kid. At age 12, she began songwriting and later learned the guitar as a teenager. In her adolescent years, Hofmann initially worked on a farm rouging canola, then worked at a local cow-calf operation where she tagged cows, delivered vaccines, and assisted in breeding operations.

After graduating high school, Hofmann worked numerous jobs, including as a receptionist and cashier, and as a server at a restaurant named "Bobby's Grill", which served as the inspiration for her song "Bob's". She had planned to attempt to go into music, but amidst the COVID-19 pandemic, there were few available opportunities for new performers. She then decided to move to western Manitoba to work on a ranch named Poplarview Stock Farm in the spring of 2021.

== Career ==
In mid-2023, Hofmann began performing at small venues near her hometown in southern Alberta. In October 2023, she posted a video of her performing her original song "Purple Gas" on TikTok, which caught the attention of American singer-songwriter Zach Bryan. Bryan invited Hofmann down to Oklahoma to film a live performance of "Purple Gas" as part of his video series "The Belting Bronco". In 2024, Bryan asked Hofmann to collaborate with him and record "Purple Gas" as a duet, which he included on his 2024 album The Great American Bar Scene. The song would go on to chart on the all-genre Billboard Hot 100 in the United States, the Canadian Hot 100, and the New Zealand Hot Singles Chart. She joined Charley Crockett as on opening date on select dates of his "$10 Cowboy Tour" in early 2024.

Later that year, Hofmann made her debut performance at the Grand Ole Opry in Nashville, Tennessee. On October 18, 2024, she released her debut EP Purple Gas on La Honda Records. In February 2025, Hofmann released a cover of Luke Bell's song "The Bullfighter". Hofmann won Female Artist of the Year, Songwriter of the Year, and Video of the Year at the 2025 Country Music Alberta Awards. She won the 2025 SiriusXM Top of the Country competition. Hofmann was nominated for Breakthrough Artist or Group of the Year and Alternative Country Album of the Year at the 2025 Canadian Country Music Association Awards.

Hofmann received a Juno Award nomination for Breakthrough Artist or Group of the Year at the Juno Awards of 2026. She will be an opening act on select dates of Shaboozey's "Outlaws Never Die Tour" in late 2026.

== Discography ==
=== Extended plays ===
List of EPs, with selected details
Title	Details
Purple Gas	Release date: October 18, 2024; Label: La Honda Records; Format: Digital download, streaming

=== Charted songs ===
Title	Year	Peak chart positions				Certifications	Album
Title	Year	US	US Country	CAN	NZ Hot	Certifications	Album
"Purple Gas" (with Zach Bryan)	2024	69	19	51	17	RIAA: Gold; MC: Platinum	Purple Gas

=== Music videos ===
Year	Video	Director
2021	"Badlands"	Nathan Clark
2024	"August"	Preston Hoffman
2025	"The Bullfighter"	Preston Hoffman

== Awards and nominations ==
Year	Association	Category	Nominated work	Result	Ref
2025	Country Music Alberta	Album of the Year	Purple Gas	Nominated	
2025	Country Music Alberta	Fans' Choice	—N/a	Nominated	
2025	Country Music Alberta	Female Artist of Year	—N/a	Won	
2025	Country Music Alberta	Songwriter(s) of the Year	"Purple Gas - Solo"	Won	
2025	Country Music Alberta	Video of the Year	"August"	Won	
2025	Canadian Country Music Association	Alternative Country Album of the Year	Purple Gas	Nominated	
2025	Canadian Country Music Association	Breakthrough Artist or Group of the Year	—N/a	Nominated	
2026	Juno Awards	Breakthrough Artist or Group of the Year	—N/a	Nominated	
