= Mico (singer) =

Canadian singer-songwriter

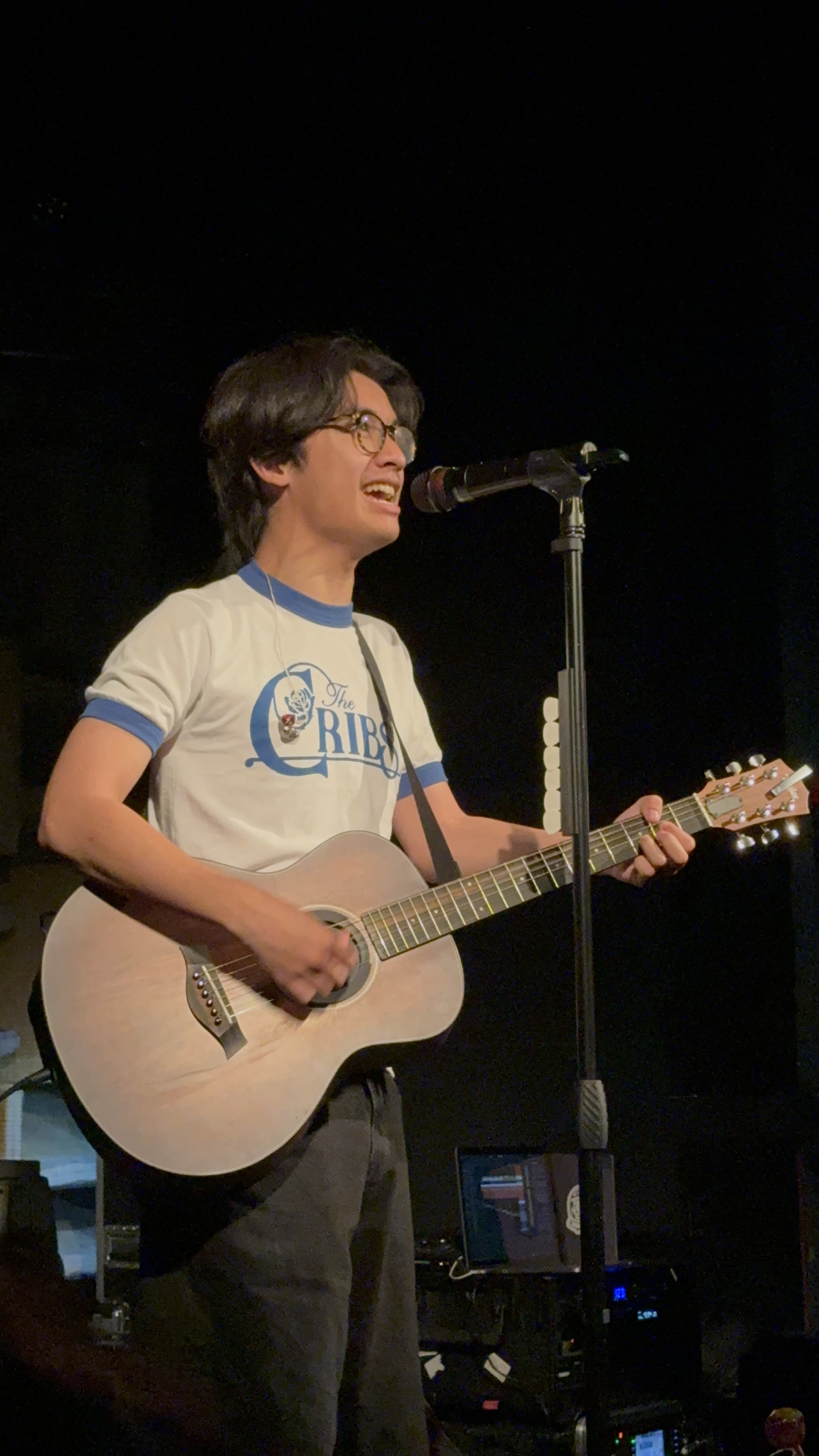
- Mico performing in Indianapolis in 2025
- Born: Jose Miguel Veloso; December 6, 2002 (age 23); Toronto, Ontario, Canada
- Occupations: Singer-songwriter; musician
- Years active: 2019–present
- Musical career
- Origin: Toronto, Canada
- Genres: Indie pop; pop-punk; indie rock
- Instruments: Vocals; guitar
- Labels: Columbia Records; Wasted Years
- Website: www.micotoronto.com

Jose Miguel Veloso (born December 6, 2002), known professionally as Mico (stylized in all caps), is a Canadian singer-songwriter and musician from Toronto. He initially grew a fanbase online through Discord and Twitch, breaking out commercially with his 2022 single "cut my hair", which became a top-30 radio hit in Canada. In 2025, he signed with Columbia Records following a string of independent extended plays.

Veloso released his debut studio album, When the lights turn on, in 2026, which charted on the US Billboard Top Album Sales and Vinyl Albums charts.

== Early life ==
Jose Miguel Veloso, who would later be known as Mico as a musician, was born and raised in Toronto, Ontario. He developed an interest in music at an early age and began performing and sharing music online during his teenage years. He attended Mayfield Secondary School in Caledon, Ontario. Mico is of Filipino descent.

== Career ==
Mico began uploading original music and covers online. His early single "Who Do You Love" (2019) was released independently. In 2020, he released his debut EP, 21st century heartbreak, followed by second thoughts (2022), the tears we fight (2023), and the afterparty (2023).

Mico's 2022 single "cut my hair" became a top-20 radio hit in Canada.

Cover art for "cut my hair" (2022)

Mico began by performing in Discord servers and on Twitch streams, which contributed to the growth of a large online fanbase and early independent success.

In 2024, Mico released the EP Internet hometown hero, accompanied by a world tour. The tour sold out multiple venues, resulting in additional shows in North America and Europe. Mico is also credited under his birth name for playing the role of Telemachus in Epic: The Musical, a serialized musical project inspired by The Odyssey.

Cover art for Internet hometown hero (2024)

A deluxe edition of Internet hometown hero, titled Internet hometown hero (+DLC), was released in May 2025. Mico also performed at Lollapalooza Berlin in July 2025. In August 2025, he signed with Columbia Records.

In 2026, Mico was nominated for the Juno Award for Breakthrough Artist or Group of the Year On January 31st, he performed at Grammy House during Grammy Week. On March 29th, he performed "HOMESICK" at the 55th Juno Awards show in Hamilton, Ontario.

In March 2026, Mico released TRIO, a limited-edition vinyl EP compiling the singles "Parasite", "Without Me", and "Ever After". The EP was released exclusively on vinyl through Mico's official store.

In May 2026, Mico announced his debut album, titled When the lights turn on, released on June 26, 2026, preceded by the singles "DREAMBOY", "Like you mean it", and "Do it all again". He later announced the Running from a Feeling Tour, covering dates across the United States, Asia, and Australia.

Cover art for When the lights turn on (2026)

In July 2026, Mico performed at FIFA Fan Festival events for the 2026 FIFA World Cup, appearing at the Vancouver Park Stage on July 3 and at Fort York National Historic Site in Toronto on July 5. In August 2026, Mico performed at Osheaga, appearing at Parc Jean-Drapeau in Montreal on August 2.

On September 18, 2026, Mico released the single "Everything's the same". A deluxe edition of When the lights turn on followed on October 16, 2026, adding five bonus tracks including "Everything's the same".

On October 10, 2026, Mico announced the In:Between Tour, a 29-date headlining tour of Europe and the United States, running from January 18, 2027, in Barcelona to March 13, 2027, in Cleveland.

== Musical style and influences ==
Mico's music combines elements of indie pop, pop punk, and alternative rock. He draws inspirations from bands such as Marianas Trench and 5 Seconds of Summer.

== Discography ==
Mico discography
- Studio albums: 1
- EPs: 11
- Singles: 36

=== Studio albums ===
List of studio albums, with selected details
| Title | Details |
|---|---|
| When the lights turn on | Released: June 26, 2026; Label: Columbia Records; Formats: streaming, CD, vinyl |
| When the lights turn on (deluxe) | Released: October 16, 2026; Label: Columbia Records; Formats: streaming |

=== Extended plays ===
List of extended plays, with selected details
| Title | EP details |
|---|---|
| 21st century heartbreak | Released: July 30, 2020; Formats: streaming |
| second thoughts | Released: June 30, 2022; Formats: streaming |
| the tears we fight | Released: September 13, 2023; Formats: streaming, vinyl |
| the afterparty | Released: December 6, 2023; Formats: streaming |
| Internet hometown hero | Released: October 25, 2024; Formats: streaming, CD |
| Internet hometown hero (offline) | Released: March 7, 2025; Formats: streaming |
| Internet hometown hero (+DLC) | Released: May 2, 2025; Formats: streaming |
| TRIO | Released: March 4, 2026; Formats: vinyl |

==== As featured artist ====
List of extended plays as featured artist, with selected details
| Title | EP details |
|---|---|
| EPIC: The Ocean Saga (Jorge Rivera-Herrans & Cast of EPIC: The Musical) | Released: December 25, 2023; Formats: streaming, CD, vinyl; Notes: Credited as Miguel Veloso; featured on "Keep Your Friends Close" |
| EPIC: The Wisdom Saga (Jorge Rivera-Herrans & Cast of EPIC: The Musical) | Released: August 30, 2024; Formats: streaming, CD, vinyl; Notes: Credited as Miguel Veloso; featured on "Legendary", "Little Wolf", and "We'll Be Fine" |
| EPIC: The Ithaca Saga (Jorge Rivera-Herrans & Cast of EPIC: The Musical) | Released: December 25, 2024; Formats: streaming, CD, vinyl; Notes: Credited as Miguel Veloso; featured on "Odysseus" and "I Can't Help but Wonder" |

=== Singles ===
List of singles, showing year released and album name
| Title | Year | Album | Notes |
|---|---|---|---|
| "who do you love" | 2019 | 21st century heartbreak | Independent release |
| "cut my hair" | 2022 | Non-album single | |
| "lie lie lie" | 2022 | second thoughts | |
| "m.i.a." | 2023 | the tears we fight | |
| "bad note" | 2023 | the tears we fight | |
| "bruise my face" | 2023 | the tears we fight | |
| "prove me wrong" | 2023 | the tears we fight | |
| "maybe i'm the problem now" | 2023 | the tears we fight | |
| "treat your friends" | 2023 | the afterparty | |
| "HOMESICK" | 2024 | Internet hometown hero | |
| "Deserve this" | 2024 | Internet hometown hero | |
| "glhf<3" | 2024 | Internet hometown hero | |
| "Idontwannaknowyou!" | 2024 | Internet hometown hero | |
| "I'd hate to be my friend" | 2025 | Internet hometown hero (+DLC) | |
| "Senses" | 2025 | Internet hometown hero (+DLC) | |
| "Ever After" (feat. eaJ) | 2025 | TRIO | |
| "Parasite" (with Haiden Henderson) | 2025 | TRIO | |
| "Without Me" | 2025 | TRIO | |
| "DREAMBOY" | 2026 | When the lights turn on | |
| "Like you mean it" | 2026 | When the lights turn on | |
| "Do it all again" | 2026 | When the lights turn on | |
| "Why are you here" | 2026 | When the lights turn on | |
| "Everything's the same" | 2026 | When the lights turn on (deluxe) | |

==== As featured artist ====
List of singles as featured artist, showing year released
| Title | Year | Notes |
|---|---|---|
| "Reality" (not Robert Barnes and Fndme. featuring MICO) | 2019 | |
| "Iris (Remix)" (not Robert Barnes and Fndme. featuring MICO) | 2020 | |
| "Ride" (David Alexander featuring MICO) | 2020 | |
| "motivation" (TruePilot featuring MICO) | 2020 | |
| "caved in" (outset and S0phearak featuring MICO) | 2020 | |
| "stay" (fcj and Ok2222 featuring MICO) | 2021 | |
| "DANCE WITH ME" (SNEAKER KIDS featuring MICO) | 2021 | |
| "Cross the Room" (Sweeney featuring MICO) | 2022 | |
| "panic marina" (acho featuring MICO) | 2022 | |
| "complicated" (Vurb and acho featuring MICO) | 2022 | |
| "Do Better" (Dolo Tonight featuring MICO) | 2023 | |
| "OFF BAT" (Atwood featuring MICO) | 2023 | |
| "close 2 me" (fcj and Ok2222 featuring MICO) | 2025 | |

== Charts ==
=== Albums ===
| Title | Details | Peak chart positions | |
| Title | Details | US Sales | US Vinyl |
|---|---|---|---|
| When the lights turn on | Released: June 26, 2026; Label: Columbia Records; Format: streaming, CD, vinyl | 29 | 23 |

=== Singles ===
| Title | Details | Peak chart positions |
| Title | Details | CAN Rock |
|---|---|---|
| "cut my hair" | Released: November 21, 2022; Format: radio | 29 |

== Tours ==
=== Headlining ===
- The Fantasy Tour (2023)
- Cancel Your Plans Tour (2024)
- Internet Hometown Hero World Tour (2024–2025)
- Running From A Feeling Tour (2026)
- In:Between Tour (2027)

=== Supporting ===
- Nightly – Live on Tour (2025)

== Awards and nominations ==
| Year | Award | Category | Work | Result |
|---|---|---|---|---|
| 2026 | Juno Awards | Juno Award for Breakthrough Artist or Group of the Year | Mico | Nominated |

== Credits ==
- Epic: The Wisdom Saga (as Telemachus; 2024) – vocals in the musical
