= Seoul City (song) =

- Promotional graphic

Song by Jennie

from the album Ruby
- Released: March 7, 2025
- Studio: Alo (Beverly Hills)
- Genre: R&B
- Length: 2:44
- Label: Odd Atelier; Columbia
- Songwriters: Jennie; Myles Edward Harris; Braylin Philip Bowman; Xeryus Gittens; Michael Len Williams II; Badriia "Bibi" Bourelly; Carly Gibert
- Producers: MoneyGoForMyles; Resource; Xeryus; Mike Will Made It

Music video
- "Seoul City" on YouTube

"Seoul City" is a song by South Korean singer and rapper Jennie. It was released through Odd Atelier and Columbia Records on March 7, 2025, as a track on her debut studio album, Ruby (2025). An accompanying music video was directed by Dasom Han and uploaded on Jennie's YouTube channel on April 26.

== Background and release ==
After departing from YG Entertainment for solo activities, Jennie founded her own record label named Odd Atelier in November 2023. She then signed as a solo artist with Columbia Records in partnership with Odd Atelier in September 2024. On January 21, 2025, Jennie officially announced her debut studio album, Ruby. She revealed the album tracklist on February 18, which included "Seoul City" as the thirteenth track. The song was subsequently released on digital and streaming platforms alongside Ruby on March 7.

== Development and recording ==
"Seoul City" was written by Jennie, Badriia "Bibi" Bourelly, Carly Gibert, and the song's producers Myles Edward Harris (known as MoneyGoForMyles), Braylin Philip Bowman (known as Resource), Xeryus Gittens (known as Xeryus), and Michael Len Williams II (known as Mike Will Made It). According to Bowman, the idea for the beat started in 2019 when Williams needed beats for Miley Cyrus. Bowman, initially envisioning the song as having a "bluesy, psychedelic rock style, with a little bit of soul", created a live drum loop with a guitar melody from Gittens and arranged live bass and keyboards around it. The recording was sent to Williams and forwarded to Harris, who used it as a sample and made it into his own beat with "festival vibes" by speeding it up, adding 808s, hats, snare, and a melody. Harris sent the beat back to Williams, and it became one of the beats picked by Jennie during a studio session with her and several songwriters. Bowman later expressed surprise about the final direction with the "rock and soul elements" being retained for a K-pop song, while Harris praised Jennie for taking it "where it needed to go sonically and vocally."

== Lyrics and composition ==
The song has been described as a "mellow" love letter to Seoul that pays tribute to the city's vibrancy and Jennie's connection to it. It celebrates the city's magical charm and honors it as the most precious place in the singer's heart. During her appearance on You Quiz on the Block, Jennie explained the meaning of "Seoul City", saying: "When I thought about the question I got from my friends, 'What is the one city in the world that can be called paradise?', I felt like I would definitely go home to Seoul." The production was noted for having "Mike Will Made It's distinctive Atlanta vibe" blending "moody synths, a deep bass groove, and layered vocal effects" to create a "hypnotic and cinematic effect." Similarly, it was described as a "slower-paced" track featuring "cinematic synths and layered tonality" as well as "moody falsettos" similar to Jennie's song "One of the Girls" (2023).

== Music video ==
The music video for "Seoul City" was directed by Dasom Han and released on Jennie's YouTube channel on April 26, 2025. It was previewed before its release during Jennie's shows for the Ruby Experience tour. The release marked the seventh music video from Ruby's 15 tracks, the first time a K-pop artist released this many music videos for an album. Jennie's extensive promotional rollout was noted for setting a new benchmark for the K-pop industry, which normally releases two or three music videos, mostly for lead singles, due to the high cost of video production and promotional expenses. The video captures the "dreamlike beauty" of Seoul and shows Jennie immersed in the city’s vibrant spirit, "enhancing the song’s nostalgic atmosphere." Jennie's looks in the video were designed by Leje, a five-year-old brand that fuses ancient Korean crafts with modern bold silhouettes as a way to reimagine the typically "reserved and elegant" Korean female identity as "confidently extravagant". Her glossy black and white tube top was constructed with a 3-D printed base, etched with mother-of-pearl inlay, and finally applied with lacquer.

== Live performances ==
Jennie included "Seoul City" on the setlist of her concert tour the Ruby Experience, which commenced in Los Angeles on March 6, 2025 at the same time as Ruby's release. She also performed the song at the Coachella Valley Music and Arts Festival on April 13 and 20. On December 20, Jennie performed "Seoul City" at the 2025 Melon Music Awards wearing a massive veil. The performance started with her face covered by the 15-meter veil, which was designed by the Korean brand Leje and featured inscriptions in Korean hangul. The inscriptions were derived from verses of the Cheonggu yeongeon (Traditional Song Collection), the earliest known collection of Korean song lyrics written in hangul. According to Leje, the concept stemmed from Jennie’s appreciation for South Korea and the Korean language, with the veil representing her facing her own roots. She performed the song on March 22, 2026 at ComplexCon Hong Kong, wearing a mini veil in tribute to the one worn at the Melon Music Awards. Jennie included the song in her headlining festival sets at Governors Ball Music Festival on June 7, Roskilde Festival on July 3, Open'er Festival on July 4, Mad Cool on July 10, and Lollapalooza on August 1.

== Usage in media ==
Jennie was named honorary ambassador by the Seoul Metropolitan Government and Seoul Tourism Organization to promote tourism in Seoul in 2025. Under the slogan "Absolutely in Seoul," the campaign comprised several promotional videos broadcast on digital billboards and television channels worldwide, one of which featured the song "Seoul City".

== Credits and personnel ==
Credits are adapted from the liner notes of Ruby.

Recording

- Recorded at Alo Studios (Beverly Hills, California)
- Mixed at Canton House Studios (Studio City, California)
- Mastered at Sterling Sound (Edgewater, New Jersey)

Personnel

- Jennie – vocals, songwriter
- MoneyGoForMyles – songwriter, producer
- Resource – songwriter, producer
- Xeryus – songwriter, producer
- Mike Will Made It – songwriter, producer
- Badriia "Bibi" Bourelly – songwriter
- Carly Gibert – songwriter
- Gage – recording engineer
- Jaycen Joshua – mix engineer
- Mike Seaberg – mix engineer
- Jacob Richards – assistant mix engineer
- Chris Bhikoo – assistant mix engineer
- Will Quinnell – mastering engineer

== Charts ==
Chart performance for "Seoul City"
| Chart (2025–2026) | Peak position |
|---|---|
| China (TME Korean) | 10 |
| Global K-Songs (Billboard Korea) | 67 |
| Singapore Regional (RIAS) | 29 |
| South Korea Download (Circle) | 72 |

== Certifications ==
Certifications
| Region | Certification | Certified units/sales |
|---|---|---|
| Brazil (Pro-Música Brasil) | Gold | 20,000^{‡} |
^{‡} Sales+streaming figures based on certification alone.
