= Baby Nova =

Canadian musician

Baby Nova is the stage name of Kayleigh O'Connor, a Canadian indie pop singer-songwriter from Halifax, Nova Scotia. Her full-length debut album Shhugar was released in 2026.

She trained in circus performance in her youth, and began writing music at age 12 before signing a licensing deal to write songs for other artists at age 16. She independently released the single "Lost Angeles" in 2024.

She worked with songwriters Lowell and Gus van Go, and producers Austin Corona and Wyatt Bernard, on Shhugar, which was released in January 2026. The album's lead single, "Killed for Sport", was released in early 2025. Later in the year she released "Too Pretty for Buffalo", which became her breakout single. Through the year, she also performed at various events, including the All Things Go Music Festival and Billboard Canada's Women in Music showcase.

The album, which saw her compared to a blend of Lana del Rey, Dusty Springfield and Johnny Cash, was longlisted for the 2026 Polaris Music Prize. Lowell received a Juno Award nomination for Songwriter (Non-Performing) of the Year at the Juno Awards of 2026 for her work on "Too Pretty for Buffalo", Ava Max's "World's Smallest Violin" and Sofia Camara's "Girls Like You".
