= Ardn =

Canadian rapper

ARDN is a Burundian-Canadian rapper from Edmonton, Alberta. He is most noted for his 2025 album Keep Your Eye on the Sparrow, which was a Juno Award nominee for Rap Album/EP of the Year at the Juno Awards of 2026.

He released his debut EP, Goodwill, in 2018, and followed up with ALIEN in 2020.

On March 5, 2023, ARDN signed to Capitol Records, marking the occasion by releasing his major label debut single “Plain Jane".
