= When the Lights Turn On =

- Standard edition cover

Studio album by Mico
- Released: June 26, 2026
- Recorded: c. 2025–2026
- Studio: MickeyMadeIt Studio (Los Angeles)
- Genres: Indie pop; pop punk; alternative rock
- Length: 28:53
- Labels: Columbia; Wasted Years
- Producers: Mico; Mickey Brandolino

Mico chronology
Trio (2026)	When the Lights Turn On (2026)

Singles from When the Lights Turn On
- 1. "Dreamboy" Released: April 24, 2026; 2. "Like You Mean It" Released: May 12, 2026; 3. "Do It All Again" Released: June 12, 2026; 4. "Why Are You Here" Released: August 13, 2026

Singles from When the Lights Turn On (Deluxe)
- 1. "Everything's The Same" Released: September 18, 2026

When the Lights Turn On is the debut studio album by Canadian singer-songwriter and musician Mico (stylized in all caps), released on June 26, 2026, by Columbia Records and Wasted Years.

The album follows his string of successful extended plays, including the EP, Trio (stylized in all caps). The album was supported by three singles: "Dreamboy", "Like You Mean It", and "Do It All Again".

Upon its release, the album charted on several Billboard sales charts, peaking at number 29 on the Top Album Sales chart and number 23 on the Vinyl Albums chart in the United States.

On May 18, 2026, Mico announced the Running From a Feeling Tour in support of the album.

== Background and release ==
In August 2025, Mico signed with Columbia Records following the release of his Internet hometown hero EP and its accompanying world tour. On April 24, 2026, he released the album's lead single, "Dreamboy". The second single, "Like You Mean It", was released on May 12, 2026.

Later that month, Mico announced the title and release date for When the Lights Turn On, alongside dates for his first international headlining concert tour, the Running From a Feeling Tour, covering North America, Asia, and Australia. The album's third single, "Do It All Again", was released in June 12, 2026 prior to the full album release. "Why Are You Here" became the fourth single, with an accompanying music video being released on August 13, 2026.

Prior to the release of "Do It All Again", the album's track listing was revealed through promotional newspaper drops across Toronto.

The album was recorded by Mickey Brandolino at MickeyMadelt Studio in Los Angeles, California. It was mixed and mastered by Matt Huber at The Print Shop in Nashville, Tennessee.

On October 16, 2026, Mico released a deluxe edition of the album, adding five bonus tracks including the previously released single "Everything's the Same". The release coincided with the general sale for the IN:BETWEEN Tour, a headlining tour of Europe and the United States beginning in January 2027.

== Composition and themes ==
When the Lights Turn On is primarily a pop-punk album incorporating elements of indie pop, alternative rock, hyperpop, and electronic music.

The album addresses themes of fame, self-doubt, personal relationships, and depression. The track listing utilizes alternating case formats, using lowercase song titles for introspective tracks and uppercase titles for more aggressive or intense tracks.

The album focuses heavily on the contrast between a public persona and internal emotional struggles. Specific tracks, such as "Your favorite flowers", detail the transition of a romantic relationship into a friendship.

== Track listing ==
When the Lights Turn On track listing
No.	Title	Writer(s)	Producer(s)	Length
1.	"Open Up Your Eyes"	Mico; Mickey Brandolino	Mico; Brandolino	3:04
2.	"Like You Mean It"	Mico; Brandolino; Nico Tripodi; Joe Kirkland	Mico; Brandolino; Tripodi^{[a]}	2:27
3.	"Do It All Again"	Mico; Brandolino; Kirkland; Peter Thomas; Caroline Pennel	Mico; Brandolino; Thomas^{[b]}	2:30
4.	"Why Are You Here"	Mico; Brandolino; Mathijs Kriebel	Mico; Brandolino	3:19
5.	"Dreamboy"	Mico; Brandolino; Chase Blohm; Grant Sayler; JBACH	Mico; Brandolino; Sayler^{[a]}	3:17
6.	"Oh!"	Mico; Tripodi; Liam Thurston Jessup; Patrick Bodi; Adam Fritzler; Sacha Paul Katz	Mico; Brandolino; 254Bodi; fritz!; 254BA$H; Tripodi^{[a]}	2:23
7.	"Shoes"	Mico; Tripodi; Jessup; Fritzler; Bodi	Mico; 254Bodi; fritz!; Brandolino	2:13
8.	"Your Favorite Flowers"	Mico; Brandolino; Callum Maudsley	Mico; Brandolino; Maudsley^{[b]}	3:29
9.	"Learning to Love"	Mico; Tripodi; Jessup; Fritzler; Bodi	Mico; Brandolino; 254Bodim; fritz!	2:57
10.	"Can't Keep Crying"	Mico; Brandolino; Tripodi; Christopher Robinson; Antonio Mejia	Mico; Brandolino; Tripodi; Neanderthal; Lizzy	3:10
Total length:				28:53

Deluxe edition bonus tracks
No.	Title	Writer(s)	Producer(s)	Length
11.	"Hate My Guts"		Mico; Tripodi; fritz!; 254Bodi; Brandolino; 254eljay	3:18
12.	"Hello, Goodbye"		Mico; Brandolino	2:29
13.	"IYKYK"		Mico; Brandolino	2:50
14.	"Sorry"		Mico; Brandolino; Joey Postiglione	2:51
15.	"Everything's the Same"		Mico; Tripodi; Brandolino	2:52
Total length:				43:13

=== Notes ===
- ^a signifies an additional producer
- ^b signifies an additional guitar contribution

== Personnel ==
Credits adapted from Genius, Shazam, and album liner notes.

Musicians

- Mico – vocals
- Callum Maudsley – guitar

Production

- Mico – production, songwriting
- Mickey Brandolino – production, songwriting
- Callum Maudsley – songwriting
- Matt Huber – mixing engineering
- Prithvi Prakash – assistant engineering

Artwork and design

- Adit Dixit – creative direction
- Inga Kan – art direction, design
- Juliet Wolf – photography

== Charts ==
Title	Details	Peak chart positions	
Title	Details	US Sales	US Vinyl
When the Lights Turn On	Released: June 26, 2026; Label: Columbia Records; Format: streaming, CD, vinyl	29	23

== Release history ==
Release history for When the Lights Turn On
Region	Date	Format(s)	Label	Ref.
Various	June 26, 2026	Digital download; streaming; CD; LP	Columbia; Wasted Years	
