= Roe Kapara =

American singer (born 1998)

- Born: Austin Sellinger; April 19, 1998 (age 28)
- Origin: St. Louis, Missouri, USA
- Genres: Power pop; Indie pop
- Occupation: Entertainer
- Years active: 2020–present
- Label: Epitaph

Austin Sellinger (born April 19, 1998), known professionally as Roe Kapara, is an American singer. His music incorporates elements of psychedelic rock and indie pop, and is known for incorporating a macabre, otherworldly, and surreal aesthetic.

== Biography ==
Kapara was born Austin Sellinger in St. Louis, and was raised in the Catholic Church in Missouri. His Catholic heritage went on to inspire his song "Preacher", the featured song on his first EP.

He spent some time living in Nashville, but moved to Los Angeles just before the COVID-19 pandemic. During this time before the pandemic, he performed a lot of live shows, including many in which he opened for comedians. During the pandemic, he began shifting to building an online presence with his songs, such as "Waiting", "Baby Blue", "I Wanted You", and "Past Grow" and soon went viral for his 2021 single "Employment Cost".

He signed with Epitaph Records in 2023, partially inspired by his close friend and musical collaborator Dolo Tonight also signing with Epitaph. He went on to collaborate with Dolo for their single "Fake My Death". that same year, among numerous other singles he created. He released his first EP, I Hope Hell Isn't Real, in 2023 and followed it up with Big Cigars and Satin Shorts in 2024. He also performed at 2000trees in 2024.

He draws inspiration from 90s movies and movies in general when writing his songs.

His music and the accompanying videos emphasize otherworldly, bizarre, surreal, and macabre imagery and presentation, for example the stop motion animation utilized in the music video to his 2023 single "The Dead Come Talking". His 2026 single "Crying on Vacation", however, leaned into surf rock.

== Discography ==
EPs:

- Big Cigars and Satin Shorts (Epitaph Records, 2024)
- I Hope Hell Isn't Real (Epitaph Records, 2023)

Singles:

- "Crying on Vacation" (2026)
- "Good Times" (2025)
- "Feel Sexy" (2025)
- "Glorious Day" (2024)
- "Fajita!" (2023)
- "The Dead Come Talking" (2023)
- "Before We Croak" ft. Chevy (2023)
- "Fake My Death" with Dolo Tonight (2023)
- "Preacher" (2023) - lead single on I Hope Hell Isn't Real
- "Better Off" (2023)
- "Everyone's Dying (Grandma's Drunk Again)" (2022)
- "Everything's Fine (Nuke Song)" (2022)
- "Make The News" (2022)
- "Things That You'd Never Expect" with Marc Indigo (2022)
- "Daisies" with Indy June (2021)
- "Employment Cost" (2021)
- "Past Grow" (2021)
- "I Wanted You" (2021)
- "Baby Blue" (2020)
- "Waiting" (2020)
