= Purple Gas =

2024 song by Noeline Hofmann and Zach Bryan

Promotional single by Zach Bryan and Noeline Hofmann

from the album The Great American Bar Scene
- Released: June 7, 2024
- Genre: Country; western
- Length: 3:00
- Label: Belting Bronco / Warner
- Songwriter: Noeline Hofmann
- Producer: Zach Bryan

Music video
- "Purple Gas" on YouTube

"Purple Gas" is a song written by Canadian singer-songwriter Noeline Hofmann. She recorded the track with American singer-songwriter Zach Bryan. The song was included on Bryan's 2024 album The Great American Bar Scene.

== Background ==
Noeline Hofmann wrote "Purple Gas", taking inspiration from the "tax-dedicated fuel" for farmers in Alberta, her time working on a ranch in western Manitoba, and her own rural upbringing. She posted a clip of the song on TikTok in late 2023, and the video caught the attention of Zach Bryan, who initially invited Hofmann to record a video of her performing the song for his series called "The Belting Bronco". Afterwards, Bryan asked Hofmann to record a duet of the song with him. The song was later included on his album The Great American Bar Scene, marking the first time Bryan recorded another artist's song for one of his albums. Bryan compared Hofmann to Gillian Welch, calling her one of his favourite artists.

== Critical reception ==
Alli Patton of Holler referred to the track as a "simple song" that "never really deviates from its delicate pattern" which "perfectly mirrors the lyrics," adding that it is "a simple sound for some simple words that make for an impactful listen".

== Music video ==
The music video for "Purple Gas" premiered on July 8, 2024, and solely features fan-sourced content, which Zach Bryan called for after the release of the song.

== Charts ==
"Purple Gas - Solo"

Promotional single by Noeline Hofmann

from the EP Purple Gas
- Released: August 27, 2024
- Genre: Country; western
- Length: 3:27
- Label: La Honda
- Songwriter: Noeline Hofmann
- Producer: Patrick Lyons

Lyric video
- "Purple Gas - Solo" on YouTube

Chart performance for "Purple Gas"
Chart (2024)	Peak position
Canada Hot 100 (Billboard)	51
New Zealand Hot Singles (RMNZ)	17
US Billboard Hot 100	69
US Hot Country Songs (Billboard)	19

== Certifications ==
Certificatons for "Purple Gas"
Region	Certification	Certified units/sales
Canada (Music Canada)	Platinum	80,000^{‡}
United States (RIAA)	Gold	500,000^{‡}
^{‡} Sales+streaming figures based on certification alone.

== Solo version ==
In August 2024, Hofmann released a solo version of "Purple Gas". This version was included on Hofmann's 2024 debut extended play, Purple Gas, serving as the title track. She released "Purple Gas" simultaneously with her song "Lighting in July (Prairie Fire)". Hofmann won Songwriter of the Year at the 2024 Country Music Alberta Awards for the solo version.

=== Track listing ===
Digital download – single

1. "Purple Gas" – 3:24
2. "Lightning in July (Prairie Fire)" – 4:02
