= Jutes (musician) =

- Born: Jordan Lutes; March 28, 1991 (age 35); Ottawa, Ontario, Canada
- Genres: Alternative metal; nu metal; hip-hop; hard rock; R&B; alternative rock
- Years active: 2015–present
- Label: Capitol
- Spouse(s): Demi Lovato (m. 2025)
- Website: jutesmusic.com

Jutes is the stage name of Jordan Lutes (born March 28, 1991), a Canadian musician from Ottawa, Ontario. He is most noted as a Juno Award nominee for Breakthrough Artist or Group of the Year at the Juno Awards of 2026.

He married American singer Demi Lovato in 2025.

== Discography ==
=== Albums ===
- A Really Bad Dream EP (2020)
- Careful What You Wish For mixtape (2021)
- Hot Trash EP (2022)
- Ladybug (2023)
- Sleepyhead (2024)
- Dilworth (2025)
- Chin Up, Beautiful (2026)

==== Singles ====
Title	Year	Peak chart positions		Album
Title	Year	US Alt.	US Hard Rock	Album
"Sleepyhead"	2024	24	13	Sleepyhead
"It Takes Two"	2025	24	—	Dilworth
"Love Psychosis"	2026	—	3	Chin Up, Beautiful (Deluxe Edition)
"—" denotes a release that did not chart.

=== Music videos ===
List of music videos, showing year released and album/EP name
Title	Year	Directors
"Walk on Me"	2018	Thomas Ridout
"Give You Up"	2018	Thomas Ridout
"Start Over"	2019	Unknown
"Where Are You Going?"	2020	Jordan Wozy
"When You're Around"	2020	Unknown
"Bad Dream"	2020	Ben Church
"Sober Up"	2021	Dan Drachman
"Give U a Call"	2021	SirJhn
"California"	2021	SirJhn
"Fvck Your Boyfriend"	2021	SirJhn
"Day Dreaming"	2021	Bright Minds Entertainment
"Those Were the Days"	2021	Jutes
"Out the Door"	2022	Unknown
"Hot Trash"	2022	Jake Doforno
"Fingers"	2023	Unknown
"Punkstar"	2023	Jake Doforno
"Quitter"	2023	Jake Doforno
"Ladybug"	2023	Unknown
"Wicked Game"	2023	Jake Doforno
"Sleepyhead"	2024	Unknown
"Red Velvet"	2025	Tommy Kelly
"SMUT"	2025	Tommy Kelly
"The End"	2025	Jake Doforno
"Left on Dilworth"	2025	Jake Doforno
"Crucifixxx"	2025	Jake Doforno
"Limerence"	2025	Unknown
"One of Us"	2025	Tommy Kelly
"Kill or Be Killed"	2025	Jake Doforno
"Fly on the Wall"	2025	Jutes
"Parasite"	2025	Tommy Kelly
"I Can Fix You"	2025	Tommy Kelly
"It Takes Two"	2025	Tommy Kelly
"Facelift"	2025	Jake Doforno
"Eulogy"	2025	Tommy Kelly
"Disassociate"	2026	B.K. Barone
"Icarus"	2026	B.K. Barone
"Mannequin"	2026	B.K. Barone
"White Butterflies"	2026	B.K. Barone
"Blink Twice"	2026	Jake Doforno
"Chin Up, Beautiful"	2026	B.K. Barone
"Cruella"	2026	B.K. Barone
