= Dolo Tonight =

American singer and rapper (born 1997)

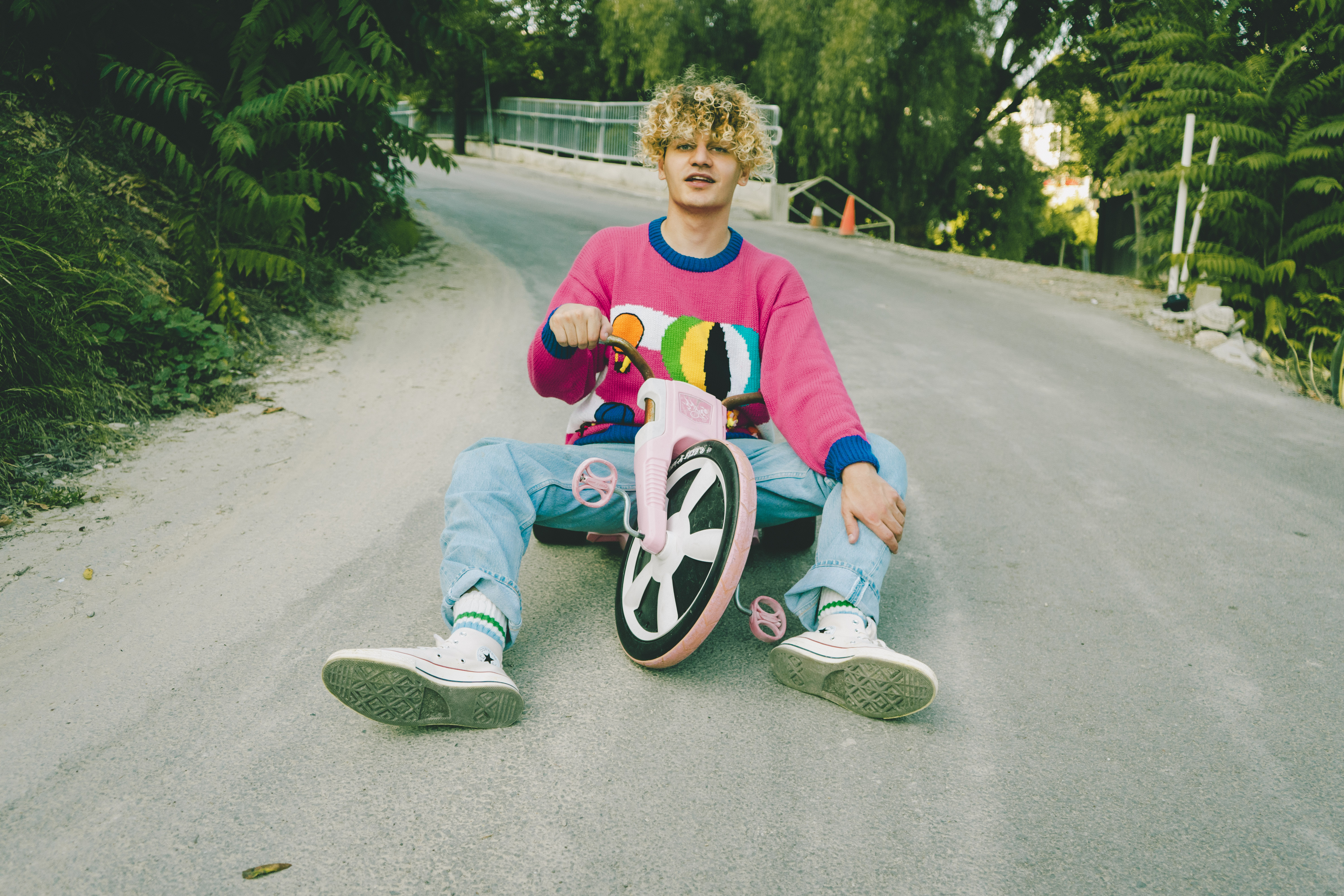

Background information
- Born: Jonah Elias Rindner; December 13, 1997 (age 28)
- Origin: Watchung, New Jersey, U.S.
- Genres: Indie rock; bedroom pop; rap; anti-pop
- Occupation: Entertainer
- Years active: 2019–present
- Labels: Epitaph; Asylum; WMG
- Website: dolotonight.world

Jonah Elias Rindner (born December 13, 1997), known professionally as Dolo Tonight, is an American singer, rapper, and multi-instrumentalist. His music incorporates elements of indie rock, pop, and hip-hop, a combination he refers to as “awkward pop.”

== Early life ==
Rindner was born in Watchung, New Jersey, on December 13, 1997, and graduated in 2016 from Watchung Hills Regional High School. He attended the University of Maine, where he studied food science before leaving to pursue music. His decision to change careers was supported by his family and faculty members. He began releasing music in 2019 after meeting producer Michael Ashby at Mission Chinese. His debut single, Too High, appeared on Spotify’s “Top 100 Breaking Artists” list in 2019.

== Career ==
Rindner signed with Asylum Records following the release of his single Zoom. In 2021, he released the EP Back to Earth. The single Higher from this release was accompanied by a music video filmed in a hot air balloon.

In 2022, Rindner signed with Epitaph Records and released the EP Life’s a Party Then You’re Dead. The six-track release explores themes of social isolation and personal relationships.

Between 2023 and 2025, he released several singles, including Fake My Death (with friend and collaborator Roe Kapara), Wakey Wakey, Parking Lot Love Story, Stranger Things, Live Your Life, and Hate You Now. Live Your Life became his first appearance on the UK Official Singles Sales Chart, reaching number 73.

His debut studio album, DVD Rental Store, was released in October 2025 by Epitaph Records. It entered the UK Official Album Downloads Chart at number 9. The album’s concept was inspired by his memories of visiting video-rental stores in childhood and features interconnected tracks presented as fictional “films”. The accompanying visuals were co-directed with filmmaker Kalik Osborne and employ VHS-era aesthetics.

== Musical style and influences ==
Rindner’s work blends elements of alternative rock, indie rock, and pop. His self-described “anti-pop” approach combines traditional pop structures with experimental production. Influences cited by Rindner include Two Door Cinema Club, MGMT, Passion Pit, and Cage the Elephant.

== Discography ==
=== Studio albums ===
- DVD Rental Store (Epitaph Records, 2025) — UK Official Album Downloads Chart: #9

=== EPs ===
- Back to Earth (Asylum Records, 2021)
- Life’s A Party Then You’re Dead (Epitaph Records, 2022)

=== Singles ===
- "Live Your Life" (2025)
- “Hate You Now” (2025)
- "Stranger Things" (2024)
- "Dog Song" (2023)
- "Tinfoil Hat" (2023)
- "This Is Fine" (2023)
- "Fake My Death" (2023) (ft: Roe Kapara)
- "Wakey Wakey" (2023)
- "Do Better" (2023) (ft. MICO)
- "Parking Lot Love Story" (2023)
- "Car Ride" (2022)
- "Tucson" (2022)
- "Simulation" (2021)
- "Higher" (2021)
- "Graduation" (2021)
