= Juno Award for Breakthrough Artist or Group of the Year =

Canadian music award

The Juno Award for Breakthrough Artist or Group is an annual Canadian music award, presented by the Juno Awards to honour emerging Canadian musicians. It was created as a merger of the formerly separate awards for Breakthrough Artist of the Year and Breakthrough Group of the Year, and was presented for the first time at the Juno Awards of 2025.

== Winners and nominees ==
Year	Winner	Nominees	Ref.
2025	Nemahsis	Tony Ann; AP Dhillon; Chris Grey; ekkstacy; AR Paisley; Owen Riegling; Alexander Stewart; Sukha; Zeina	
2026	Cameron Whitcomb	Goldie Boutilier; Sofia Camara; Saya Gray; Noeline Hofmann; Jutes; Jade LeMac; MICO; Sacha; yung kai	
