= Christine Piunguałaq Tootoo =

Christine Piunguałaq Tootoo (born 1989) is a Inuk artist from Rankin Inlet, Nunavut. Her work is under the artist name Piunguałaq, in the genres pisiit and katajjaq. Her debut album Anirniliit Suli was nominated Juno Awards of 2026 in the "Traditional Indigenous Artist or Group of the Year" category. She has performed in multiple theatre productions, including Ikumagialiit, Kiviuq Returns and Unikkaaqtuat.
