= Sofia Camara =

Portuguese musician (born 2002)

- Camara in 2026 at the Montreux Jazz Festival

Background information
- Born: 21 May 2002 (age 24); Terceira Island, Portugal
- Genre: Pop
- Occupations: Musician; singer; songwriter
- Instruments: Vocals; guitar
- Years active: 2021–present
- Label: Universal
- Website: www.sofiacamara.com

Sofia Camara (born 21 May 2002) is a Portuguese and Canadian pop musician. Her debut EP, Was I(t) Worth It? was released on Universal Music Canada in 2025, followed later that year by her second EP, Hard to Love.

== Early life ==
Camara was born in Terceira Island, Portugal, and raised in Toronto, Canada. She started writing music at the age of 13. In her teens, Camara would perform in public spaces, such as subway stations, and post videos of the performances on social media. She went viral for her covers of songs by artists including Taylor Swift and Justin Bieber.

== Career ==
In 2022, Camara signed with Universal Music Canada / 21 Entertainment and released the single "Never Be Yours", which reached number 19 on the Billboard Canada CHR/Top 40, number 22 on the Canada Hot Adult Contemporary chart, and number 34 on the Canada Adult Contemporary chart. Her 2024 single "Who Do I Call Now? (Hellbent)" charted on Spotify's Viral 50 in Canada, the Netherlands, Poland and Norway. She and Dean Lewis collaborated on the 2025 single "With You", appearing on the deluxe edition of Lewis's album The Epilogue.

Camara performing in 2025

On 21 March 2025, Camara released her debut EP, Was I(t) Worth It? on Universal Music Canada, featuring the previously released singles "Who Do I Call Now? (Hellbent)" and "Starlight" along with four new tracks. She co-wrote every song on the EP, with songwriters and producers including Lowell, Nathan Ferraro, and Mike Wise. Her single "Girls Like You", released on 30 May 2025 and produced by Mike Wise, Donny Bravo, Nathan Ferraro, and Lowell, reached number 9 on the Billboard Canadian CHR/Top 40, and number 37 on the Billboard Canadian Hot 100. It was number 89 on the year-end Radio Songs chart, and was named by Billboard Canada as one of 25 songs that defined the 2025 charts.

Camara's second EP, Hard to Love, was released on Universal Music Canada on 10 October 2025. It includes the singles "Girls Like You" and "Parking Lot", and features production from Mike Wise, Lowell and Nathan Ferraro. Camara was named to the Billboard list of 10 Canadian Artists to Watch in 2026.

She received a Juno Award nomination for Breakthrough Artist or Group of the Year at the Juno Awards of 2026. She also performed her single "Girls Like You" during the televised ceremony, held on March 29 at the TD Coliseum in Hamilton, Ontario.

Camara in 2026 performing in Cardiff

In May 2026, Camara released "The Last Encounter", her first single of the year, accompanied by an official music video. The song was released through 21 Entertainment Group and Universal Music Canada, with international support from Mercury Records and Polydor Records.

On 14 August 2026, she released "Best Friend", a song co-written with JP Saxe, Ryan Marrone, Alex Sutton and TJ Whitelaw, and produced by Mike Wise. The song had previously been performed live at the All Things Go Music Festival in Toronto.

In September 2026, Camara announced her third EP, Still Somewhere Here, and released the single "Hallucinating". The six-track EP was released on 9 October 2026, through 21 Entertainment Group and Universal Music Canada. It includes "Hallucinating", "Best Friend", "Nostalgic", "Unlike You", "The Last Encounter" and "Lay in It Lonely". Visualizers for several tracks accompanied the release. Her song "Girls Like You" won the 2026 SOCAN Viral Song Award.

== Performances ==
In 2023, Camara opened for Scott Helman on his Back Together tour, and for Virginia to Vegas on his Life Gets Interesting tour. In 2024, she opened for Shawn Desman in Canada, Alex Warren in Europe, and Dean Lewis in the UK. She also headlined a show in Europe and performed the Canadian national anthem before the CFL's Grey Cup championship game. In 2025, she performed at Osheaga Festival in Montreal and Lollapalooza in Chicago.

Camara opened for Stevie Nicks on two dates in October 2025. Starting on 13 October 2025, in Manchester, England, Camara embarked on the Healing Hearts Tour, her first headline tour across the UK, Europe, and North America. Camara supported Bastille on the band's From All Sides UK tour in November 2025, and joined Lauren Spencer Smith's The Art of Being a Mess Tour in 2026.

In 2026, Camara expanded her international live performances with appearances at major music festivals, including All Things Go Toronto, Rock in Rio Lisboa, Pinkpop in the Netherlands, the Montreux Jazz Festival in Switzerland, and Lollapalooza Berlin in Germany.

She also performed alongside Bastille again, at Cardiff Castle in July 2026 and supported the Canadian rock band the Beaches at the Conexus Arts Centre in Regina in August.

Her appearance at All Things Go Toronto was covered by Billboard Canada, which highlighted her nine-song set, including performances of "Parking Lot" and "Who Do I Call Now? (Hellbent)".

On 2 October 2026, Camara announced the Sincerely Yours, Tour, a UK and Europe headline tour scheduled for January and February 2027. The tour is set to begin on 31 January at the O2 Institute in Birmingham and conclude on 17 February in Oslo, Norway. American singer-songwriter Ally Salort was announced as the special guest for the tour. In October 2026, Camara was announced as a performer at the Billboard Canada Women in Music celebration in Toronto on 24 November 2026.

== Awards ==
Year	Award	Category	Work	Result
2024	International Portuguese Music Awards	New Talent	Sofia Camara	Nominated
2026	Juno Awards	Breakthrough Artist or Group of the Year	Sofia Camara	Nominated
2026	SOCAN Awards	Viral Song Award	"Girls Like You"	Won

== Discography ==
=== EPs ===
Title	Album details
Was I(t) Worth It?	Released: 21 March 2025; Formats: Digital download, streaming; Label: 21 Entertainment Group, Universal Music Canada
Hard to Love	Released: 10 October 2025; Formats: Digital download, streaming; Label: 21 Entertainment Group, Universal Music Canada
Still Somewhere Here	Released: 9 October 2026; Formats: Digital download, streaming; Label: 21 Entertainment Group, Universal Music Canada

=== Singles ===
List of singles, with showing year released, peak chart positions and album name
Title	Year	Peak chart positions				Album
Title	Year	CAN	CAN Top 40	CAN Hot AC	CAN AC	Album
"Without You"	2021	—	—	—	—	Non-album singles
"Never Be Yours"	2022	—	19	22	34	Non-album singles
"Something Better"	2023	—	—	—	—	Non-album singles
"Different"	2023	—	—	—	—	Non-album singles
"Let It Snow! Let It Snow! Let It Snow!"	2023	—	—	—	—	Non-album singles
"Who Do I Call Now? (Hellbent)"	2024	—	—	—	—	Was I(t) Worth It?
"Starlight"	2024	—	—	—	—	Was I(t) Worth It?
"Myself"	2024	—	—	—	—	Non-album singles
"Do You Love Me"	2024	—	—	—	—	Non-album singles
"What Are You Waiting For?"	2024	—	—	—	—	Non-album singles
"With You" (with Dean Lewis)	2025	—	—	—	—	The Epilogue
"Girls Like You"	2025	37	9	5	20	Hard to Love
"Parking Lot"	2025	—	—	—	—	Hard to Love
"The Last Encounter"	2026	—	—	—	—	Still Somewhere Here
"Best Friend"	2026	—	—	—	—	Still Somewhere Here
"Hallucinating"	2026	—	32	—	—	Still Somewhere Here
"—" denotes a recording that did not chart or was not released in that territory.
