= Saya Gray =

Canadian musician (born 1995)

- Born: 1995 (age 30–31); Toronto, Ontario, Canada
- Genre: Alternative pop
- Label: Dirty Hit
- Formerly of: Quincy Bullen Band
- Website: sayagray.ca

Saya Gray (born 1995) is a Canadian musician, singer-songwriter, and record producer. Known for her experimental music, she has released three EPs: QWERTY (2023), QWERTY II (2024), QWERTY III (2026); and two albums: 19 Masters (2022), and SAYA (2025).

== Early life ==
Gray was born in 1995 and raised in Toronto, Ontario, Canada, growing up in the affluent Beaches neighbourhood of Toronto. Her mother is the founder of the Discovery Through the Arts music school in Toronto. She is of Japanese-Canadian descent. Her mother's family moved from Shizuoka Prefecture in Japan to Canada when her mother was ten years old. Her father is a Scottish-Canadian jazz trumpet player who studied at the Berklee College of Music. Her brother, Lucian Gray, who plays the guitar, appears on her album 19 Masters. She began playing the piano at a young age, eventually deciding around the age of ten to play bass.

== Musical career ==
Gray began playing music in a house band for a Jamaican Pentecostal church. At the age of eighteen, Gray was a music teacher and a member of the Quincy Bullen Band. After dropping out of high school in order to take night classes instead, she moved to London in the United Kingdom at the age of nineteen. She worked as a touring bassist for over ten years prior to releasing music. She previously played as a bassist in Canadian singer and songwriter Daniel Caesar's touring band. She has also been a musical director for American singer Willow Smith and a bassist for English singer and songwriter Liam Payne.

In 2019, Gray began releasing original music. Her debut album, 19 Masters, was released on 2 June 2022. In 2023 and 2024, she released the dual extended plays QWERTY and QWERTY II.

Her second album, Saya, was released on 21 February 2025. The album was shortlisted for the 2025 Polaris Music Prize. She received a Juno Award nomination for Breakthrough Artist or Group of the Year at the Juno Awards of 2026, and Saya was nominated for Alternative Album of the Year.

She appeared on Charlotte Day Wilson's 2026 album Patchwork, performing on the song "Lean". The song was shortlisted for the 2026 SOCAN Polaris Song Prize.

== Personal life ==
Gray has lived in Toronto, Japan and the United Kingdom. She was living in Tokyo as of March 2024.

== Discography ==
=== Albums ===
- 19 Masters (2022)
- Saya (2025)

=== EPs ===
- QWERTY (2023)
- QWERTY II (2024)
- QWERTY III (2026)

Mixtapes

- SAYA DEMO MIXTAPE (2025)
