= Nathan Ferraro =

Canadian songwriter and record producer

Nathan Ferraro is a Canadian songwriter and record producer. He is best known for writing and producing the Beyoncé song "Texas Hold 'Em", for which he was nominated for three Grammy Awards. He has also worked on songs performed by Bülow and Charli XCX.

== Career ==
Ferraro started writing songs at age 14.

Ferraro was formerly the lead singer of the Midway State. During this period, he collaborated with Lady Gaga.

Ferraro worked with Bülow for "Not a Love Song". Along with Bülow and Lowell, he also worked on the Charli XCX song "Yuck" and the Beyoncé single "Texas Hold 'Em".

== Accolades ==
Year	Nominated work	Category	Award	Result	Notes	Ref.
2024	"Texas Hold 'Em"	The Female Song of 2024	2024 People's Choice Country Awards	Nominated		
2025	"Texas Hold 'Em"	Record of the Year	67th Annual Grammy Awards	Nominated		
2025	"Texas Hold 'Em"	Song of the Year	67th Annual Grammy Awards	Nominated		
2025	"Texas Hold 'Em"	Best Country Song	67th Annual Grammy Awards	Nominated		
2025	"Texas Hold 'Em" "Smoke" performed by Ari Lennox "Who Do I Call Now? (Hellbent)" performed by Sofia Camara	Songwriter of the Year, Non-Performer	Juno Awards of 2025	Nominated		

In addition to the above, Ferraro won the Music Canada Songwriting and Music Publishing 2x Platinum Award for "Texas Hold 'Em", as well as seven SOCAN awards in general, including one for "Selfish" by Virginia to Vegas.

== Production discography ==
=== Singles ===
Artist	Title	Ref.
Virginia to Vegas	"We Are Stars" (ft. Alyssa Reid)	
Virginia to Vegas	"Selfish"	
Bülow	"Not a Love Song"	
Bülow	"Boys Will Be Boys"	
Bülow	"Sweet Little Lies"	
Bülow	"Two Punks in Love"	
Neon Dreams	"High School Dropout"	
Charli XCX	"Yuck"	
Beyoncé	"Texas Hold 'Em"	

=== Albums ===
Artist	Title	Ref.
Lia Pappas-Kemps	Gleam	
