= Mad Cool =

Annual music festival

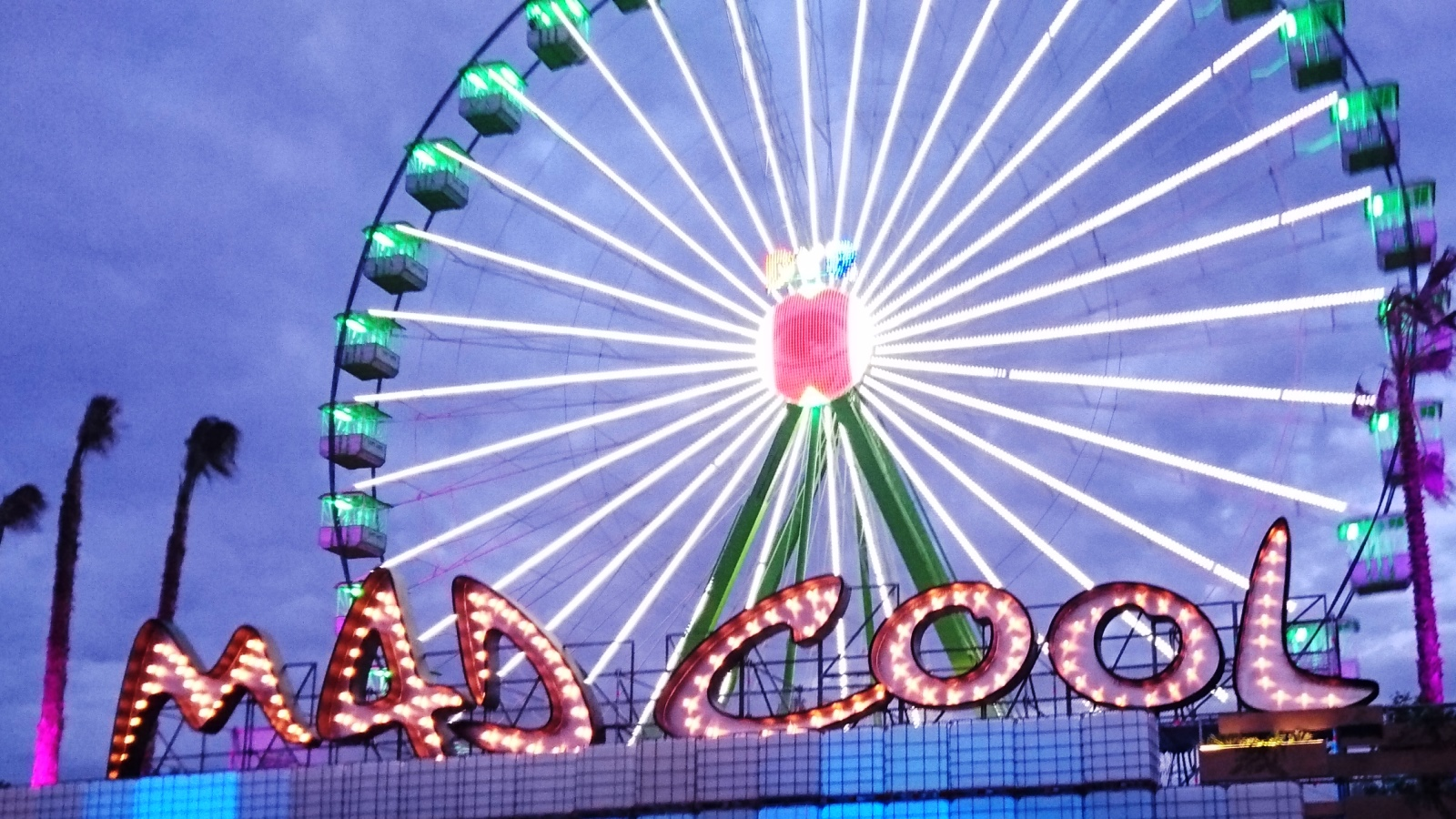
- Genre: pop · rock · indie · electro
- Locations: Madrid, Spain
- Years active: 2016–present

Mad Cool is a music festival held annually in Madrid, Spain, since 2016. It chiefly features pop, rock, and indie music, as well as various DJs and electronic music performers.

The 2016 and 2017 festivals took place in the Caja Mágica. The organization then moved the festival to an open-air space in Valdebebas. Peak attendance happened in the 2018 edition, with 240,000 participants distributed along the three days of the festival (12–14 July), featuring a troubling first day due to agglomerations. In the 2020 edition, the daily maximum attendance was reduced to 60,000 by the organization due to the COVID-19 pandemic, and the length was expanded to four full festival days.

Since 2023, the festival takes place at the Iberdrola Music open-air space in Villaverde.

== Lineups ==
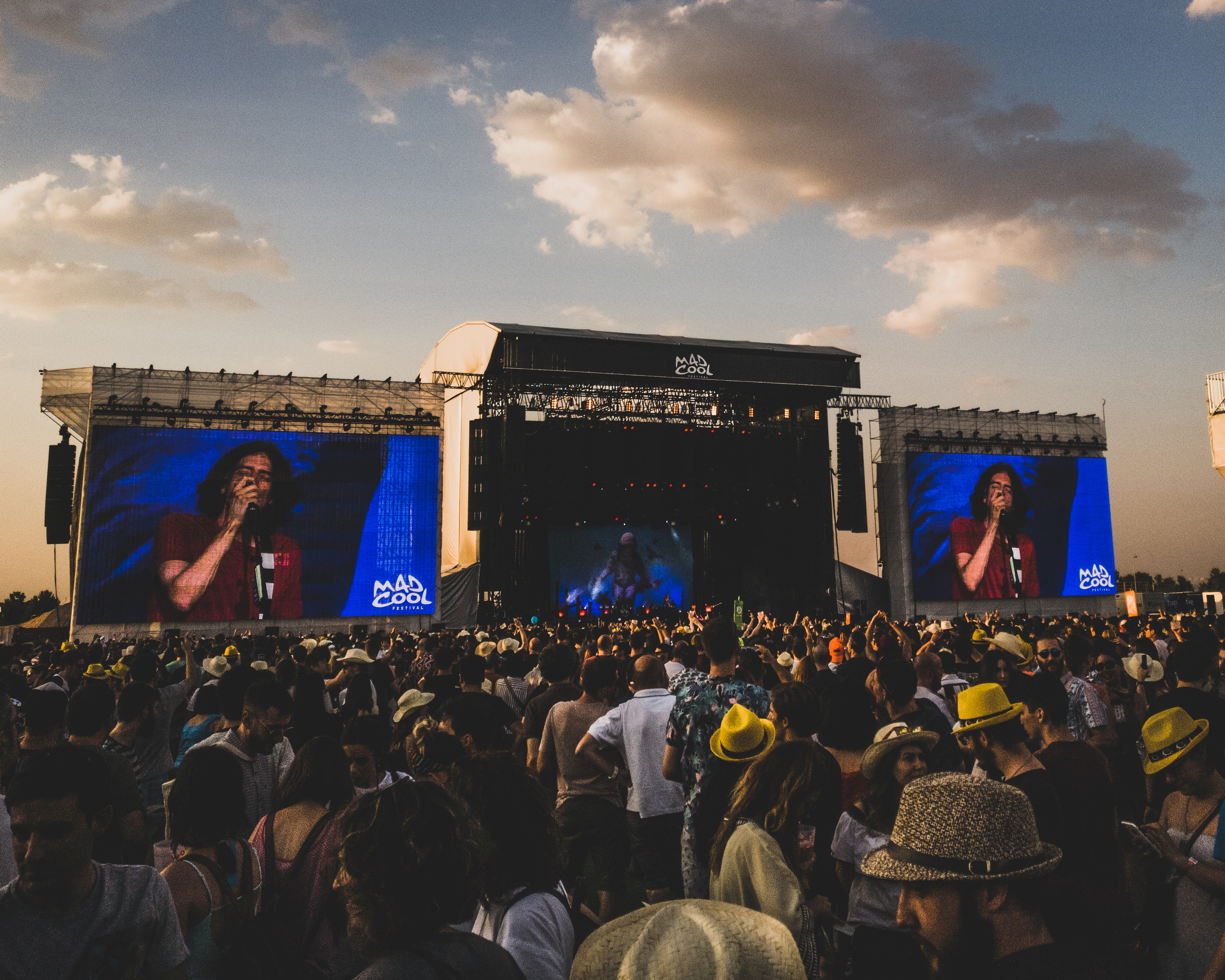
Mad Cool 2018

Acts performing at the festival have included:

- 2016 (16–18 June): The Who · Vetusta Morla · Editors · Garbage · Lori Meyers · The Prodigy · Die Antwoord · Jane's Addiction · Bastille · Band of Horses · Neil Young · Two Door Cinema Club · Biffy Clyro · Capital Cities.
- 2017 (6–8 July): Foo Fighters · Foals · Belle and Sebastian · The Lumineers · Green Day · Alt-J · Ryan Adams · Rancid · Cage the Elephant · Spoon · Kings of Leon · Wilco · M.I.A. · Foster the People · Moderat · Dinosaur Jr.
- 2018 (12–14 July): Pearl Jam · Tame Impala · Kasabian · Post Malone · Arctic Monkeys · Jack White · Massive Attack · Franz Ferdinand · Snow Patrol · Alice in Chains · Depeche Mode · Queens of the Stone Age · Nine Inch Nails · Dua Lipa · Underworld.
- 2019 (11–13 July): Bon Iver · Vampire Weekend · Ms. Lauryn Hill · The Chemical Brothers · Noel Gallagher’s High Flying Birds · Empire of the Sun · Iggy Pop · The National · Vetusta Morla · The Smashing Pumpkins · Vince Staples · Marina · Sharon Van Etten · Wolfmother · Miles Kane · The Cure · Prophets of Rage · Robyn · Gossip · Greta Van Fleet · Rosalía.
- 2020 (8–11 July): Cancelled due to the COVID-19 pandemic.
- 2021 (7–10 July): Cancelled due to the COVID-19 pandemic.
- 2022 (6–10 July): Metallica · Twenty One Pilots · Placebo · Imagine Dragons · The Killers · Muse · Kings of Leon · Pixies · Florence and The Machine · Carly Rae Jepsen · Wolf Alice · Yungblud · Deftones · St. Vincent · Foals · Leon Bridges · Sylvan Esso · Sigrid · Tove Lo · Alt-J · The War on Drugs · MØ · Jamie Cullum · Parcels · Royal Blood · Zara Larsson · Editors · Daytime TV · Nothing but Thieves · Phoebe Bridgers · Black Pumas.
- 2023 (6–8 July): Robbie Williams · Lizzo · Lil Nas X · Machine Gun Kelly · Queens of the Stone Age · The Black Keys · Sam Smith · Red Hot Chili Peppers · Liam Gallagher · M.I.A. · The Prodigy · Sigur Rós · The 1975 · Franz Ferdinand · Rina Sawayama · Paolo Nutini · Rüfüs Du Sol · Tash Sultana · Jacob Collier · Puscifer · Jamie xx · Years & Years · Sylvan Esso · Bombay Bicycle Club · Angel Olsen · The Driver Era · Men I Trust · Pixey
- 2024: (10–13 July): Dua Lipa · The Killers · Måneskin · The Smashing Pumpkins · Pearl Jam · Avril Lavigne · Greta Van Fleet · Bring Me the Horizon · Sum 41 · Keane
- 2025: (10–12 July): Muse· Nine Inch Nails · Olivia Rodrigo · Noah Kahan · Alanis Morissette · Gracie Abrams · Iggy Pop · Justice · Leon Bridges · Mother Mother · Circa Waves · Blondshell · Mark Ambor · Tanner Adell · Natalia Lacunza · almost monday · Kingfishr
- 2026: (8-11 July): Foo Fighters · Florence and the Machine · Twenty One Pilots · Nick Cave and the Bad Seeds · Moby · Jennie · Kings of Leon · Pulp · The War on Drugs · Lorde · Pixies · The Black Crowes · Wolf Alice · Teddy Swims · Halsey · David Byrne
