= Deb Never =

- Born: Deborah Jung; April 14, 1993 (age 33)
- Origin: Los Angeles, California, U.S.
- Genres: Alternative pop; emo pop; grunge
- Occupations: Singer-songwriter, musician
- Years active: 2017–present
- Labels: Moonlanding; FAE; WeDidIt; Giant Music
- Website: debnever.com

Deborah Jung (born April 14, 1993), best known professionally as Deb Never, is an American singer-songwriter and musician based in Los Angeles, California.

To date, her discography consists of one studio album; Arcade (2026) released through American independent label, Giant Music, alongside three EP's; House on Wheels (2019), Where Have All the Flowers Gone? (2021) and Thank You for Attending (2023).

== Early life ==
Jung grew up in Seattle and Spokane, Washington, and also lived in China, Malaysia, and South Korea as a child. Her mother is a nurse, while her father is a traveling pastor. She is of Korean descent. She suffered from social anxiety as a child. Interested in music from a young age, she began playing the guitar at the age of eleven, learning how to do so on one that she stole from a South Korean church.

As a student at a South Korean middle school, music became a "lifeline" to her due to an inability to speak the Korean language. She began writing music at the age of fifteen. She utilized the software GarageBand to teach herself to create music. In 2015, instead of attending the University of Washington, where she was accepted to, she moved to Los Angeles to take up guitar session work.

== Musical career ==
One origin for Jung's stage name is that it comes from a joke on social media about a nonexistent person who likes one's posted photos. An alternative origin is that the stage name was invented by her sister, who goes by "Esther Never" . She began sharing demos online in 2017. She released her first single, "mr nobody," in 2018.

She signed to the Los Angeles-based label and musical collective, WeDidIt in 2019. She released her first extended play, House on Wheels, that same year. In 2020, she released a project entitled Intermission, which she recorded during the COVID-19 pandemic and exclusively released on the platforms Bandcamp and SoundCloud. In 2021, she released her second extended play and first short film, "Where Have All the Flowers Gone?". She released her third and final extended play, Thank You for Attending, in 2023. The extended play was her final one, as she intends to release her debut album in the future. Her album Arcade was released on May 8, 2026.

== Personal life ==
Never identifies as gay and queer. She had a girlfriend as of May 2019.

== Discography ==
=== Studio albums ===
List of studio albums, with selected details
Title	Album details
Arcade	Released: May 8, 2026; Label: Giant Music; Format: LP, Digital download, streaming

=== Extended plays ===
List of extended plays, with selected details
Title	Album details
House on Wheels	Released: August 30, 2019; Label: WeDidIt Records; Format: Digital download, streaming
Where Have All the Flowers Gone?	Released: September 10, 2021; Label: Moonlanding, FAE; Format: LP, Digital download, streaming
Thank You for Attending	Released: April 28, 2023; Label: Moonlanding, FAE; Format: Digital download, streaming

=== Mixtapes ===
List of recorded projects released informally or without label involvement
Title	Album details
Intermission	Released: May 22, 2020; Label: Self-released; Format: Digital download, streaming (Bandcamp; SoundCloud)
