= List of awards and nominations received by Jennie =

Jennie awards and nominations
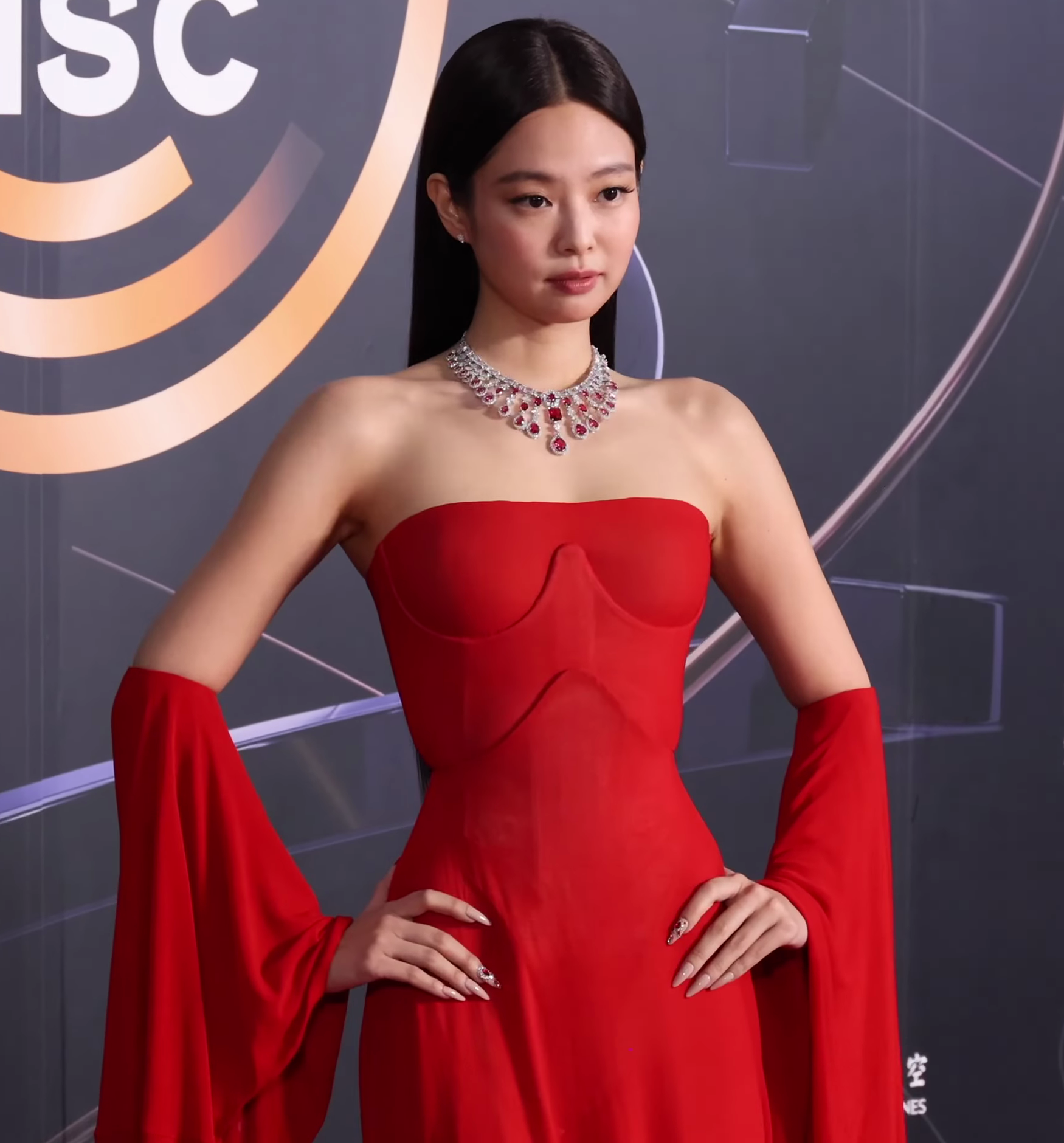
- Jennie at the 40th Golden Disc Awards in January 2026
Awards and nominations
Award	Wins	Nominations
American Music Awards	0	1
Asia Artist Awards	0	4
Asia Star Entertainer Awards	0	2
Asian Pop Music Awards	8	19
Berlin Commercial Festival	0	1
Billboard Women in Music	1	1
Brand of the Year Awards	3	3
BreakTudo Awards	1	5
Circle Chart Awards	1	2
Clio Awards	1	1
D Awards	1	3
Edaily Culture Awards	0	1
The Fact Music Awards	0	3
Filipino Music Awards	0	1
Genie Music Awards	0	1
Golden Disc Awards	4	9
Grammy Awards	0	2
Hanteo Music Awards	0	15
Hollywood Music in Media Awards	0	1
iHeartRadio Music Awards	1	7
Japan Gold Disc Awards	1	1
K-World Dream Awards	0	1
KM Chart Awards	0	1
Korea Broadcasting Awards	1	1
Korea First Brand Awards	0	2
Korea Grand Music Awards	1	7
Korean Music Awards	2	5
Los 40 Music Awards	0	1
MAMA Awards	6	23
Melon Music Awards	3	11
MTV Video Music Awards	0	2
Music Awards Japan	0	4
Nickelodeon Kids' Choice Awards	1	2
NRJ Music Awards	0	1
Philippine K-pop Awards	1	1
SBS Entertainment Awards	0	2
SEC Awards	1	10
Seoul Music Awards	1	8
Webby Awards	1	1
Weibo Starlight Awards	1	1

Totals (Note: Certain award groups do not simply award one winner. They acknowledge several different recipients, have runners-up, and have third place. Since this is a specific recognition and is different from losing an award, runner-up mentions are considered wins in this award tally. For simplification and to avoid errors, each award in this list has been presumed to have had a prior nomination.)
- Wins: 40
- Nominations: 167

Jennie is a South Korean singer and rapper and a member of the South Korean girl group Blackpink. She released her debut solo single "Solo" in November 2018, which won the Best Digital Song bonsang (Note: A bonsang (Korean: 본상), which translates to "main prize", is a major award given at a South Korean award ceremony to multiple artists.) at the 34th Golden Disc Awards and Artist of the Year – Digital Music (November) at the 8th Gaon Chart Music Awards. The song also garnered nominations for the Song of the Year at the 34th Golden Disc Awards and the 2019 Mnet Asian Music Awards. Jennie's single "You & Me" (2023) was awarded Best Dance Performance Female Solo at the 2024 MAMA Awards. Her 2024 collaboration "Spot!" with Zico earned two awards for Best Collaboration and Best Rap & Hip Hop Performance at the same ceremony, while Jennie was awarded Fans' Choice Female Top 10 as well. In 2024, Jennie was named Star of the Year: Domestic by Rolling Stone Korea.

Jennie became the first solo artist in history to win the daesang (Note: A daesang (Korean: 대상), which translates to "grand prize", is the highest honour given out at South Korean music award ceremonies in recognition of the artist(s) with the greatest physical and digital achievements for the year.) for Record of the Year at the 2025 Melon Music Awards, where she was also awarded Top 10 Artists and Millions Top 10 for her debut studio album Ruby (2025). She became the first artist to win the inaugural daesang for Artist of the Year at the 40th Golden Disc Awards, where she received the Global Impact Award and the Best Digital Song bonsang for the album's single "Like Jennie". The song won Best Dance Performance Female Solo at the 2025 MAMA Awards, while the album track "Zen" won Best Music Video. Ruby and "Like Jennie" were awarded Best K-pop Album and Best K-pop Song respectively at the 23rd Korean Music Awards. "Like Jennie" also garnered nominations for Song of the Year at the 40th Golden Disc Awards, 2025 MAMA Awards and 2025 Melon Music Awards, and Best K-Pop at the 2025 MTV Video Music Awards. Her collaboration "Dracula" with Tame Impala received two nominations at the 69th Annual Grammy Awards for Record of the Year and Best Pop Duo/Group Performance. Jennie ranked first place on Forbes's K-Idol of the Year 30 list and earned a placement on the Korea Power Celebrity 40 in 2025-2026 and Time's list of the 100 most influential people in the world in 2026.

== Awards and nominations ==
Name of the award ceremony, year presented, category, nominee(s) of the award, and the result of the nomination
Award ceremony	Year	Category	Nominee(s)/work(s)	Result	Ref.
American Music Awards	2026	Song of the Summer	"Dracula" (with Tame Impala)	Nominated	
Asia Artist Awards	2023	Popularity Award – Singer (Female)	Jennie	Nominated	
Asia Artist Awards	2024	Popularity Award – Singer (Female)	Jennie	Nominated	
Asia Artist Awards	2025	Popularity Award – Solo (Female)	Jennie	Nominated	
Asia Artist Awards	2026	Popularity Award – Solo (Female)	Jennie	Pending	
Asia Star Entertainer Awards	2025	The Best Solo (Female)	Jennie	Nominated	
Asia Star Entertainer Awards	2026	The Best Solo (Female)	Jennie	Nominated	
Asian Pop Music Awards	2024	Best Music Video (Overseas)	"Mantra"	Won	
Asian Pop Music Awards	2024	Top 20 Songs of the Year (Overseas)	"Mantra"	Won	
Asian Pop Music Awards	2024	People's Choice Award (Overseas)	"Mantra"	1st place	
Asian Pop Music Awards	2024	Best Collaboration (Overseas)	"Spot!" (with Zico)	Nominated	
Asian Pop Music Awards	2024	Best Dance Performance (Overseas)	"Mantra"	Nominated	
Asian Pop Music Awards	2024	Best Female Artist (Overseas)	Jennie	Nominated	
Asian Pop Music Awards	2024	Record of the Year (Overseas)	"Mantra"	Nominated	
Asian Pop Music Awards	2024	Song of the Year (Overseas)	"Mantra"	Nominated	
Asian Pop Music Awards	2025	Best Dance Performance	"Like Jennie"	Won	
Asian Pop Music Awards	2025	Best Female Artist	Jennie	Won	
Asian Pop Music Awards	2025	Top 20 Songs of the Year	"Like Jennie"	Won	
Asian Pop Music Awards	2025	Top 20 Albums of the Year	Ruby	Won	
Asian Pop Music Awards	2025	People's Choice Award	Ruby	9th place	
Asian Pop Music Awards	2025	Best Album of the Year	Ruby	Nominated	
Asian Pop Music Awards	2025	Best Collaboration	"Handlebars" (featuring Dua Lipa)	Nominated	
Asian Pop Music Awards	2025	Best Lyricist	"Like Jennie"	Nominated	
Asian Pop Music Awards	2025	Best Music Video	"Zen"	Nominated	
Asian Pop Music Awards	2025	Best Producer	Ruby	Nominated	
Asian Pop Music Awards	2025	Song of the Year	"Like Jennie"	Nominated	
Berlin Commercial Festival	2025	Craft: Editing	"Handlebars" (featuring Dua Lipa)	Nominated	
Billboard Women in Music	2025	Global Force Award	Jennie	Won	
Brand of the Year Awards (Note: Established in 2003, the Brand of the Year Awards is an awards ceremony based on nationwide surveys hosted by the Korea Consumer Brand Committee and organized by the Korea Consumer Forum.)	2022	Advertising Model (Female)	Jennie	Won	
Brand of the Year Awards	2025	Female Solo Singer (Indonesia)	Jennie	Won	
Brand of the Year Awards	2026	Female Solo Singer (Vietnam)	Jennie	Won	
BreakTudo Awards	2024	K-pop Hit of the Year	"Spot!" (with Zico)	Nominated	
BreakTudo Awards	2025	International Female Artist	Jennie	Won	
BreakTudo Awards	2025	International Hit of the Year	"Like Jennie"	Nominated	
BreakTudo Awards	2026	International Female Artist	Jennie	Pending	
BreakTudo Awards	2026	International Hit of the Year	"Dracula" (with Tame Impala)	Pending	
Circle Chart Music Awards	2019	Artist of the Year – Digital Music (November)	"Solo"	Won	
Circle Chart Music Awards	2024	Mubeat Global Choice Award – Female	Jennie	Nominated	
Clio Awards	2026	Music Marketing – Direction	"Love Hangover" (featuring Dominic Fike)	Bronze	
D Awards	2025	Best Girl Solo Popularity Award	Jennie	Nominated	
D Awards	2026	Best Girl Solo Popularity Award	Jennie	Won	
D Awards	2026	Upick Global Choice (Girl)	Jennie	Nominated	
Edaily Culture Awards (Note: The Edaily Culture Awards are a South Korean award ceremony established in 2013 to honor the year's best achievements in six categories: theatre, classical, dance, Korean music, musicals and concerts. Winners are selected by a panel of 54 judges who are professionals in each field.)	2025	Concert Category Grand Prize	The Ruby Experience	Nominated	
The Fact Music Awards	2021	Fan N Star Choice Artist	Jennie	Nominated	
The Fact Music Awards	2021	Fan N Star Choice Individual	Jennie	Nominated	
The Fact Music Awards	2024	Best Music: Winter	"You & Me"	Nominated	
Filipino Music Awards	2025	People’s Choice Awards: International Artist	Jennie	Nominated	
Genie Music Awards	2019	The Female Solo	Jennie	Nominated	
Golden Disc Awards	2020	Best Digital Song (Bonsang)	"Solo"	Won	
Golden Disc Awards	2020	Song of the Year (Daesang)	"Solo"	Nominated	
Golden Disc Awards	2025	Best Digital Song (Bonsang)	"Spot!" (with Zico)	Nominated	
Golden Disc Awards	2026	Artist of the Year (Daesang)	Jennie	Won	
Golden Disc Awards	2026	Best Digital Song (Bonsang)	"Like Jennie"	Won	
Golden Disc Awards	2026	Global Impact with Prizm Award	Jennie	Won	
Golden Disc Awards	2026	Song of the Year (Daesang)	"Like Jennie"	Nominated	
Golden Disc Awards	2026	Best Album (Bonsang)	Ruby	Nominated	
Golden Disc Awards	2026	Most Popular Artist (Female)	Jennie	Nominated	
Grammy Awards	2027	Best Pop Duo/Group Performance	"Dracula" (with Tame Impala)	Pending	
Grammy Awards	2027	Record of the Year	"Dracula" (with Tame Impala)	Pending	
Hanteo Music Awards	2025	Artist of the Year (Bonsang)	Jennie	Nominated	
Hanteo Music Awards	2025	Global Artist – Africa	Jennie	Nominated	
Hanteo Music Awards	2025	Global Artist – Asia	Jennie	Nominated	
Hanteo Music Awards	2025	Global Artist – Europe	Jennie	Nominated	
Hanteo Music Awards	2025	Global Artist – North America	Jennie	Nominated	
Hanteo Music Awards	2025	Global Artist – Oceania	Jennie	Nominated	
Hanteo Music Awards	2025	Global Artist – South America	Jennie	Nominated	
Hanteo Music Awards	2026	Best Popular Artist	Jennie	Nominated	
Hanteo Music Awards	2026	Global Popular Artist – Africa	Jennie	Nominated	
Hanteo Music Awards	2026	Global Popular Artist – Asia	Jennie	Nominated	
Hanteo Music Awards	2026	Global Popular Artist – Europe	Jennie	Nominated	
Hanteo Music Awards	2026	Global Popular Artist – North America	Jennie	Nominated	
Hanteo Music Awards	2026	Global Popular Artist – South America	Jennie	Nominated	
Hanteo Music Awards	2026	Global Popular Artist – Oceania	Jennie	Nominated	
Hanteo Music Awards	2026	Hanteo Top 10	Jennie	Nominated	
Hollywood Music in Media Awards	2026	Song – Animated Film	"Someone to Hold"	Nominated	
iHeartRadio Music Awards	2026	K-pop Album of the Year	Ruby	Won	
iHeartRadio Music Awards	2026	Best Music Video	"Like Jennie"	Nominated	
iHeartRadio Music Awards	2026	Favorite Debut Album	Ruby	Nominated	
iHeartRadio Music Awards	2026	Favorite K-pop Collab	"ExtraL" (featuring Doechii)	Nominated	
iHeartRadio Music Awards	2026	Favorite TikTok Dance	"Like Jennie"	Nominated	
iHeartRadio Music Awards	2026	K-pop Artist of the Year	Jennie	Nominated	
iHeartRadio Music Awards	2026	K-pop Song of the Year	"Like Jennie"	Nominated	
Japan Gold Disc Awards	2026	Song of the Year by Download (Western)	"Like Jennie"	Won	
K-World Dream Awards	2025	Girl Solo Popularity Award	Jennie	Nominated	
KM Chart Awards (Note: Hosted by KM Chart and KM Chart World and organized by the KMA Organizing Committee and Upick, the KM Chart Awards is an awards ceremony to honor K-pop artists for their contributions to the global music scene over the previous year.)	2026	Best Popular Solo Female Award	Jennie	Nominated	
Korea Broadcasting Awards	2026	Best Variety Show Performer	The Secret Friends Club	Won	
Korea First Brand Awards (Note: Hosted by the Korea Consumer Brand Committee and the Korea Consumer Forum, the Korea First Brand Awards bases its winners on a nationwide South Korean survey.)	2025	Best Female Solo Singer	Jennie	Nominated	
Korea First Brand Awards	2026	Best Female Solo Singer (Vietnam)	Jennie	Nominated	
Korea Grand Music Awards	2024	Best Song 10	"You & Me"	Nominated	
Korea Grand Music Awards	2024	Best Hip-Hop	"Spot!" (with Zico)	Nominated	
Korea Grand Music Awards	2024	Trend of the Year – K-pop Solo	Jennie	Nominated	
Korea Grand Music Awards	2025	Best Artist 10	Jennie	Won	
Korea Grand Music Awards	2025	Best Music 10	Ruby	Nominated	
Korea Grand Music Awards	2025	Fan Favorite Artist (Female)	Jennie	Nominated	
Korea Grand Music Awards	2025	Trend of the Year – K-pop Solo	Jennie	Nominated	
Korean Music Awards	2026	Best K-pop Album	Ruby	Won	
Korean Music Awards	2026	Best K-pop Song	"Like Jennie"	Won	
Korean Music Awards	2026	Album of the Year	Ruby	Nominated	
Korean Music Awards	2026	Musician of the Year	Jennie	Nominated	
Korean Music Awards	2026	Song of the Year	"Like Jennie"	Nominated	
Los 40 Music Awards	2026	Best International Song	"Dracula" (with Tame Impala)	Nominated	
MAMA Awards	2019	Artist of the Year	Jennie	Nominated	
MAMA Awards	2019	Best Dance Performance Solo	"Solo"	Nominated	
MAMA Awards	2019	Best Female Artist	Jennie	Nominated	
MAMA Awards	2019	Song of the Year	"Solo"	Nominated	
MAMA Awards	2024	Best Collaboration	"Spot!" (with Zico)	Won	
MAMA Awards	2024	Best Dance Performance Female Solo	"You & Me"	Won	
MAMA Awards	2024	Best Rap & Hip Hop Performance	"Spot!" (with Zico)	Won	
MAMA Awards	2024	Fans' Choice Female Top 10	Jennie	Won	
MAMA Awards	2024	Artist of the Year	Jennie	Nominated	
MAMA Awards	2024	Best Female Artist	Jennie	Nominated	
MAMA Awards	2024	Fans' Choice of the Year	Jennie	Nominated	
MAMA Awards	2024	Song of the Year	"Spot!" (with Zico)	Nominated	
MAMA Awards	2024	Song of the Year	"You & Me"	Nominated	
MAMA Awards	2025	Best Dance Performance Female Solo	"Like Jennie"	Won	
MAMA Awards	2025	Best Music Video	"Zen"	Won	
MAMA Awards	2025	Artist of the Year	Jennie	Nominated	
MAMA Awards	2025	Best Choreography	"Like Jennie"	Nominated	
MAMA Awards	2025	Best Collaboration	"ExtraL" (featuring Doechii)	Nominated	
MAMA Awards	2025	Best Female Artist	Jennie	Nominated	
MAMA Awards	2025	Song of the Year	"ExtraL" (featuring Doechii)	Nominated	
MAMA Awards	2025	Song of the Year	"Like Jennie"	Nominated	
MAMA Awards	2025	Song of the Year	"Zen"	Nominated	
MAMA Awards	2026	Best Vocal Performance Solo	"Less Than a Lover"	Nominated	
Melon Music Awards	2024	Millions Top 10	"Spot!" (with Zico)	Nominated	
Melon Music Awards	2025	Record of the Year	Jennie	Won	
Melon Music Awards	2025	Top 10 Artist	Jennie	Won	
Melon Music Awards	2025	Millions Top 10	Ruby	Won	
Melon Music Awards	2025	Album of the Year	Ruby	Nominated	
Melon Music Awards	2025	Artist of the Year	Jennie	Nominated	
Melon Music Awards	2025	Berriz Global Fans' Choice	Jennie	Nominated	
Melon Music Awards	2025	Best Female Solo	Jennie	Nominated	
Melon Music Awards	2025	Song of the Year	"Like Jennie"	Nominated	
Melon Music Awards	2026	Best Female Solo	Jennie	Nominated	
Melon Music Awards	2026	Global Top 10	Jennie	Nominated	
MTV Video Music Awards	2025	Best K-Pop	"Like Jennie"	Nominated	
MTV Video Music Awards	2026	Song of Summer	"Dracula" (with Tame Impala)	Nominated	
Music Awards Japan	2026	Best International Hip Hop/Rap Song in Japan	"ExtraL" (featuring Doechii)	Nominated	
Music Awards Japan	2026	Best K-Pop Song in Japan	"Like Jennie"	Nominated	
Music Awards Japan	2026	Best of Listeners' Choice: International Song	"Like Jennie"	Nominated	
Music Awards Japan	2026	Best of Listeners' Choice: International Song	"ExtraL" (featuring Doechii)	Nominated	
Nickelodeon Kids' Choice Awards	2025	Favorite Female Breakout Artist	Jennie	Nominated	
Nickelodeon Kids' Choice Awards	2026	Favorite Music Collaboration	"Dracula" (with Tame Impala)	Won	
NRJ Music Awards	2026	International Collaboration of the Year	"Dracula" (with Tame Impala)	Nominated	
Philippine K-pop Awards	2018	Best Female Solo Artist	Jennie	Won	
SBS Entertainment Awards	2018	Rookie Award (Female)	Running Man, Village Survival, the Eight	Nominated	
SBS Entertainment Awards	2018	Scene Stealer Award	Running Man, Village Survival, the Eight	Nominated	
SEC Awards (Note: The SEC Awards, formerly known as the Séries em Cena Awards, is a Brazilian award show that honors achievements in music, film, television, and internet culture in Brazil and globally.)	2024	Best Actress in an International Series	The Idol	Won	
SEC Awards	2024	Asian Artist of the Year	Jennie	Nominated	
SEC Awards	2024	International Feat of the Year	"One of the Girls" (with the Weeknd and Lily-Rose Depp)	Nominated	
SEC Awards	2025	Asian Artist of the Year	Jennie	Nominated	
SEC Awards	2025	International Album/EP of the Year	Ruby	Nominated	
SEC Awards	2025	International Feat of the Year	"ExtraL" (featuring Doechii)	Nominated	
SEC Awards	2025	International Female Artist of the Year	Jennie	Nominated	
SEC Awards	2025	International Song of the Year	"Like Jennie"	Nominated	
SEC Awards	2026	International Feat of the Year	"Dracula" (with Tame Impala)	Nominated	
SEC Awards	2026	International Female Artist of the Year	Jennie	Nominated	
Seoul Music Awards	2025	Main Prize (Bonsang)	Jennie	Nominated	
Seoul Music Awards	2025	Ballad Award	"Handlebars" (featuring Dua Lipa)	Nominated	
Seoul Music Awards	2025	K-pop World Choice – Solo	Jennie	Nominated	
Seoul Music Awards	2025	K-Wave Special Award	Jennie	Nominated	
Seoul Music Awards	2025	Popularity Award	Jennie	Nominated	
Seoul Music Awards	2026	Main Prize (Bonsang)	Jennie	Nominated	
Seoul Music Awards	2026	K-pop World Choice – Solo	Jennie	Nominated	
Seoul Music Awards	2026	Korea Wave Award	Jennie	Nominated	
Webby Awards	2026	Music, General Video & Film	"Does Jennie Know Her Lyrics From Her Biggest Songs?" – Variety	Won	
Weibo Starlight Awards	2021	Starlight Hall of Fame (Korea)	Jennie	Won	

== Other accolades ==
=== State and cultural honors ===
Name of country, year given, and name of honor
Country	Year	Honor	Ref.
South Korea (Note: Awarded at the Korean Popular Culture and Arts Awards, organised by the Korea Creative Content Agency and hosted by the South Korean Ministry of Culture, Sports and Tourism. Honors are given to individuals or groups for their contribution to popular culture in South Korea and abroad.)	2026	Okgwan Order of Cultural Merit (4th Class)	
United Kingdom	2023	Most Excellent Order of the British Empire (MBE)	

=== Listicles ===
Name of publisher, year listed, name of listicle, and placement
Publisher	Year	Listicle	Placement	Ref.
Billboard Korea	2024	K-Pop Artist 100	64th	
Billboard Korea	2025	K-Pop Artist 100	38th	
Complex	2026	The 25 Best Dressed K-Pop Stars of All Time, Ranked	2nd	
Complex	2026	The Best Dressed Female K-Pop Stars of All Time, Ranked	1st	
Complex	2026	The 30 Best K-Pop Solo Artists Right Now, Ranked	1st	
Forbes Korea	2025	Power Celebrity 40	20th	
Forbes Korea	2025	K-Idol of the Year 30	1st	
Forbes Korea	2026	Power Celebrity 40	16th	
Rolling Stone Korea	2024	Star of the Year: Domestic	Placed	
Rolling Stone Korea	2025	Musician of the Year	Placed	
Time	2026	Time 100	Placed	

=== Streaming milestones ===
Name of the achievement, year presented, category, and work(s)
Achievement	Year	Category	Work(s)	Ref.
Spotify Billions Club	2024	Billions Club Plaque	"One of the Girls"	

== See also ==
- List of awards and nominations received by Blackpink
