= List of awards and nominations received by Zico =

Zico awards and nominations
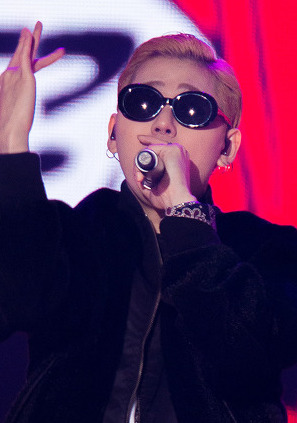
- Zico at the 2016 Melon Music Awards
Awards and nominations
| Award | Wins | Nominations |

Totals (Note: Certain award groups do not simply award one winner. They acknowledge several different recipients, have runners-up, and have third place. Since this is a specific recognition and is different from losing an award, runner-up mentions are considered wins in this award tally. For simplification and to avoid errors, each award in this list has been presumed to have had a prior nomination.)
- Wins: 39
- Nominations: 117

This is a comprehensive list of awards and nominations received by South Korean rapper, record producer and singer-songwriter Zico. A member of boy band Block B, he has individually been the recipient of numerous awards.

== Awards and nominations ==
Name of the award ceremony, year presented, nominee(s) of the award, award category, and the result of the nomination
| Award | Year | Category | Recipient | Result | Ref. |
|---|---|---|---|---|---|
| Asia Artist Awards | 2017 | Best Star Award | Zico | Won | |
| Asia Artist Awards | 2018 | Artist of the Year – Music | Zico | Won | |
| Asia Artist Awards | 2018 | Best Musician | Zico | Won | |
| Asia Artist Awards | 2019 | Best Producer Award | Zico | Won | |
| Asia Artist Awards | 2019 | Best Artist – Music | Zico | Won | |
| Asian Pop Music Awards | 2024 | Best Collaboration (Overseas) | "Spot!" (featuring Jennie) | Nominated | |
| Asian Pop Music Awards | 2025 | Best Lyricist | "Like Jennie" | Nominated | |
| BreakTudo Awards | 2024 | K-pop Hit of the Year | "Spot!" (featuring Jennie) | Nominated | |
| Gaon Chart Music Awards | 2016 | Song of the Year – November | "Boys and Girls" | Won | |
| Gaon Chart Music Awards | 2016 | Popular Singer of the Year | Zico | Nominated | |
| Gaon Chart Music Awards | 2018 | Song of the Year – July | "Artist" | Nominated | |
| Gaon Chart Music Awards | 2019 | Song of the Year – July | "SoulMate" | Nominated | |
| Gaon Chart Music Awards | 2020 | Song of the Year – January | "Any Song" | Won | |
| Gaon Chart Music Awards | 2020 | Song of the Year – July | "Summer Hate" | Won | |
| Genie Music Awards | 2020 | Song of the Year (Daesang) | "Any Song" | Won | |
| Genie Music Awards | 2020 | Best Rap/Hip Hop | "Any Song" | Won | |
| Golden Disc Awards | 2017 | Best Digital Song (Bonsang) | "I Am You, You Are Me" | Won | |
| Golden Disc Awards | 2017 | Song of the Year (Daesang) | "I Am You, You Are Me" | Nominated | |
| Golden Disc Awards | 2018 | Best Digital Song (Bonsang) | "Artist" | Nominated | |
| Golden Disc Awards | 2019 | Best Digital Song (Bonsang) | "SoulMate" | Nominated | |
| Golden Disc Awards | 2020 | Best R&B/HipHop | Zico | Won | |
| Golden Disc Awards | 2021 | Best Digital Song (Bonsang) | "Any Song" | Won | |
| Golden Disc Awards | 2021 | Song of the Year (Daesang) | "Any Song" | Nominated | |
| Golden Disc Awards | 2021 | Curaprox Popularity Award | Zico | Nominated | |
| Golden Disc Awards | 2021 | QQ Music Popularity Award | Zico | Nominated | |
| Golden Disc Awards | 2021 | Trend of the Year | "Any Song" | Won | |
| Golden Disc Awards | 2025 | Best Digital Song (Bonsang) | "Spot!" (featuring Jennie) | Nominated | |
| HipHopPlaya Awards | 2011 | Featuring of the Year | Zico | Nominated | |
| HipHopPlaya Awards | 2012 | Featuring of the Year | Zico | Nominated | |
| HipHopPlaya Awards | 2012 | Mixtape of the Year | Zico on the Block 1.5 | Won | |
| HipHopPlaya Awards | 2013 | Collaboration of the Year | "Feel So Young (Remix)" (with Ugly Duck and Crush) | Won | |
| HipHopPlaya Awards | 2015 | Artist of the Year | Zico | Nominated | |
| HipHopPlaya Awards | 2015 | Rookie of the Year | Zico | Nominated | |
| HipHopPlaya Awards | 2015 | Fashion Icon of the Year | Zico | Won | |
| KMC Awards | 2014 | Best Rap Song | "Tough Cookie" | Won | |
| K-World Dream Awards | 2023 | K Global Best Performance Award | Zico | Won | |
| K-World Dream Awards | 2023 | K Global Best Hip Hop Award | Zico | Won | |
| K-World Dream Awards | 2024 | Best Song Award | Zico | Won | |
| Korea Music Copyright Association | 2017 | Artist Award | Zico | Won | |
| Korean Hip-hop Awards | 2018 | Artist of the Year | Zico | Nominated | |
| Korean Hip-hop Awards | 2023 | Track of the Year | "New Thing" | Won | |
| Korean Music Awards | 2020 | Best Pop Song | "Any Song" | Nominated | |
| Korean Music Awards | 2020 | Song of the Year | "Any Song" | Nominated | |
| MBC Entertainment Awards | 2014 | Popularity Award – Music/Talk Show | Zico (with Minho and Sohyun) | Won | |
| Melon Music Awards | 2015 | Best R&B/Soul Award | "Oasis" (with Crush) | Nominated | |
| Melon Music Awards | 2015 | Best OST Award | "It Hurts" (with Sojin) | Nominated | |
| Melon Music Awards | 2016 | Artist of the Year (Daesang) | Zico | Nominated | |
| Melon Music Awards | 2016 | Best Rap/Hip Hop Award | "Eureka" (with Sojin) | Won | |
| Melon Music Awards | 2016 | Best R&B/Soul Award | "I Am You, You Are Me" | Nominated | |
| Melon Music Awards | 2016 | Song of the Year (Daesang) | "I Am You, You Are Me" | Nominated | |
| Melon Music Awards | 2016 | Top 10 Artists (Bonsang) | Zico | Won | |
| Melon Music Awards | 2016 | Hot Trend Award | Zico | Won | |
| Melon Music Awards | 2017 | Best Rap/Hip Hop Award | "Bermuda Triangle" | Nominated | |
| Melon Music Awards | 2017 | Best R&B/Soul Award | "She's a Baby" | Nominated | |
| Melon Music Awards | 2017 | Top 10 Artists (Bonsang) | Zico | Nominated | |
| Melon Music Awards | 2018 | Best R&B/Soul Award | "SoulMate" (feat. IU) | Nominated | |
| Melon Music Awards | 2020 | Artist of the Year (Daesang) | Zico | Nominated | |
| Melon Music Awards | 2020 | Top 10 Artists (Bonsang) | Zico | Won | |
| Melon Music Awards | 2020 | Song of the Year (Daesang) | "Any Song" | Nominated | |
| Melon Music Awards | 2020 | Best Rap/Hip Hop Award | "Any Song" | Nominated | |
| Melon Music Awards | 2020 | Hot Trend Award | Zico | Nominated | |
| Melon Music Awards | 2024 | Best Solo – Male | Zico | Nominated | |
| Melon Music Awards | 2024 | Millions Top 10 | "Spot!" (featuring Jennie) | Nominated | |
| Melon Music Awards | 2025 | Best Producer | Zico | Won | |
| MAMA Awards | 2016 | Best Male Artist | Zico | Won | |
| MAMA Awards | 2016 | Artist of the Year | Zico | Nominated | |
| MAMA Awards | 2016 | Best Rap Performance | "I Am You, You Are Me" | Nominated | |
| MAMA Awards | 2016 | Song of the Year | "I Am You, You Are Me" | Nominated | |
| MAMA Awards | 2017 | Best Male Artist | Zico | Won | |
| MAMA Awards | 2017 | Best Hip Hop & Urban Music | "Artist" | Nominated | |
| MAMA Awards | 2017 | Song of the Year | "Artist" | Nominated | |
| MAMA Awards | 2017 | Artist of the Year | Zico | Nominated | |
| MAMA Awards | 2018 | Best Male Artist | Zico | Nominated | |
| MAMA Awards | 2018 | Artist of the Year | Zico | Nominated | |
| MAMA Awards | 2018 | Best Hip Hop & Urban Music | "SoulMate" | Won | |
| MAMA Awards | 2018 | Song of the Year | "SoulMate" | Nominated | |
| MAMA Awards | 2020 | Artist of the Year | Zico | Nominated | |
| MAMA Awards | 2020 | Best Collaboration | "Summer Hate" (with Rain) | Nominated | |
| MAMA Awards | 2020 | Best Hip Hop & Urban Music | "Any Song" | Won | |
| MAMA Awards | 2020 | Best Male Artist | Zico | Nominated | |
| MAMA Awards | 2020 | Song of the Year | "Summer Hate" (with Rain) | Nominated | |
| MAMA Awards | 2020 | Song of the Year | "Any Song" | Nominated | |
| MAMA Awards | 2020 | Worldwide Icon of the Year | Zico | Nominated | |
| MAMA Awards | 2022 | Global Music Trend Leader | Zico | Won | |
| MAMA Awards | 2024 | Best Collaboration | "Spot!" (featuring Jennie) | Won | |
| MAMA Awards | 2024 | Best Rap & Hip Hop Performance | "Spot!" (featuring Jennie) | Won | |
| MAMA Awards | 2024 | Song of the Year | "Spot!" (featuring Jennie) | Nominated | |
| MAMA Awards | 2024 | Worldwide Fans' Choice Male | Zico | Nominated | |
| MAMA Awards | 2026 | Worldwide Fans' Choice Male | Zico | Nominated | |
| MAMA Awards | 2026 | Best Rap & Hip Hop Performance | "Duet" | Won | |
| Music Awards Japan | 2026 | Best Cross-Over Collaboration Song | "Duet" | Nominated | |
| Seoul Music Awards | 2015 | Main Prize (Bonsang) | "Boys and Girls" | Nominated | |
| Seoul Music Awards | 2015 | Main Prize (Bonsang) | "It Hurts" (with Sojin) | Nominated | |
| Seoul Music Awards | 2015 | Popularity Award | Zico | Nominated | |
| Seoul Music Awards | 2016 | Hallyu Special Award | Zico | Nominated | |
| Seoul Music Awards | 2016 | Main Prize (Bonsang) | "I Am You, You Are Me" | Won | |
| Seoul Music Awards | 2016 | Popularity Award | Zico | Nominated | |
| Seoul Music Awards | 2017 | Hallyu Special Award | Zico | Nominated | |
| Seoul Music Awards | 2017 | Main Prize (Bonsang) | Zico | Nominated | |
| Seoul Music Awards | 2017 | Popularity Award | Zico | Nominated | |
| Seoul Music Awards | 2018 | Main Prize (Bonsang) | "SoulMate" | Nominated | |
| Seoul Music Awards | 2018 | Hallyu Special Award | Zico | Nominated | |
| Seoul Music Awards | 2018 | Popularity Award | Zico | Nominated | |
| Seoul Music Awards | 2020 | K-wave Popularity Award | Zico | Nominated | |
| Seoul Music Awards | 2020 | Main Prize (Bonsang) | Zico | Nominated | |
| Seoul Music Awards | 2020 | Popularity Award | Zico | Nominated | |
| Seoul Music Awards | 2020 | R&B Hip Hop Award | Zico | Nominated | |
| Seoul Music Awards | 2022 | Grand Award (Daesang) | Zico | Nominated | |
| Seoul Music Awards | 2022 | Hallyu Special Award | Zico | Nominated | |
| Seoul Music Awards | 2022 | Main Prize (Bonsang) | Zico | Won | |
| Seoul Music Awards | 2022 | Popularity Award | Zico | Nominated | |
| Seoul Music Awards | 2025 | K-pop World Choice – Solo | Zico | Nominated | |
| Seoul Music Awards | 2025 | K-Wave Special Award | Zico | Nominated | |
| Seoul Music Awards | 2025 | Main Prize (Bonsang) | Zico | Nominated | |
| Seoul Music Awards | 2025 | Popularity Award | Zico | Nominated | |
| Seoul Music Awards | 2025 | R&B/ Hip-hop Award | Zico | Nominated | |
| Urban Music Awards | 2017 | Artist of the Year (Asia) | Zico | Nominated | |

== Other accolades ==
=== State and cultural honors ===
Name of country, year given, and name of honor or award
| Country | Year | Honor or Award | Ref. |
|---|---|---|---|
| South Korea (Note: Honors are given at the Korean Popular Culture and Arts Awards, arranged by the Korea Creative Content Agency and hosted by the Ministry of Culture, Sports and Tourism. They are awarded to those who have contributed to the arts and South Korea's pop culture.) | 2022 | Prime Minister's Commendation | |

=== Listicles ===
Name of publisher, year listed, name of listicle, and placement
| Publisher | Year | Listicle | Placement | Ref. |
|---|---|---|---|---|
| Forbes | 2016 | Korea Power Celebrity | 34th | |
| Forbes | 2017 | Korea Power Celebrity | 17th | |
| GQ Korea | 2022 | Men of the Year | Placed | |
