= Hollywood Music in Media Award for Best Original Song in an Animated Film =

Film music award category

Hollywood Music in Media for Best Original Song in an Animated Film
- Country: United States
- Presented by: Hollywood Music in Media Awards (HMMA)
- First award: 2014
- Currently held by: "I Knew It, I Knew You" from Toy Story 5 (2026)
- Website: www.hmmawards.com

The Hollywood Music in Media Award for Best Original Song in an Animated Film is one of the awards given annually to people working in the motion picture industry by the Hollywood Music in Media Awards (HMMA). It is presented to the songwriters who have composed the best "original" song, written specifically for an animated film. The award was first given in 2014, during the fifth annual awards.

== Statistics ==
DreamWorks Animation holds the record for the most wins for this category, while their very own Trolls film series (alongside Justin Timberlake) have the most wins in this category with three.

== Winners and nominees ==
=== 2010s ===
Year	Film	Song	Nominees
(2014); 5th
(2014); 5th	The Lego Movie	"Everything Is Awesome"	Shawn Patterson, Bartholomew, Lisa Harriton, Andy Samberg, Akiva Schaffer & Jorma Taccone
(2014); 5th	How to Train Your Dragon 2	"Where No One Goes"	Jónsi and John Powell
(2014); 5th	Mr. Peabody & Sherman	"Kid"	Peter Andre
(2014); 5th	Planes: Fire & Rescue	"Still I Fly"	Spencer Lee, Michael Smidi Smith and Windy Wagner
(2014); 5th	Rio 2	"What Is Love"	Janelle Monáe
(2015); 6th
(2015); 6th	Home	"Dancing in the Dark"	Tor Erik Hermansen, Mikkel Storleer Eriksen, Ester Dean, Maureen Anne McDonald & Rihanna
(2015); 6th	Home	"Feel the Light"	Tor Erik Hermansen, Mikkel Storleer Eriksen, Kiesza Rae Ellestad and Emile Haynie
(2015); 6th	The Peanuts Movie	"Better When I'm Dancin'"	Meghan Trainor
(2015); 6th	Shaun the Sheep Movie	"Feels Like Summer"	Tim Wheeler, Ilan Eshkeri and Nick Hodgson
(2016); 7th
(2016); 7th	Trolls	"Can't Stop the Feeling!"	Justin Timberlake, Max Martin and Shellback
(2016); 7th	Moana	"We Know the Way"	Mark Mancina, Opetaia Foa'i and Lin-Manuel Miranda
(2016); 7th	Sausage Party	"The Great Beyond"	Alan Menken, Glenn Slater, Seth Rogen & Evan Goldberg
(2016); 7th	Sing	"Faith"	Francis Farewell Starlite, Ryan Tedder & Stevie Wonder
(2016); 7th	Zootopia	"Try Everything"	Mikkel Storleer Eriksen, Tor Erik Hermansen and Sia
(2017); 8th
(2017); 8th	Leap!	"Confident"	Demi Lovato, Savan Kotecha, Max Martin and Ilya Salmanzadeh
(2017); 8th	Beauty and the Beast	"How Does a Moment Last Forever"	Alan Menken and Tim Rice
(2017); 8th	Captain Underpants: The First Epic Movie	"Captain Underpants Theme Song"	"Weird Al" Yankovic
(2017); 8th	Despicable Me 3	"There's Something Special"	Pharrell Williams
(2017); 8th	Smurfs: The Lost Village	"I'm a Lady"	Martin René & Meghan Trainor
(2017); 8th	Smurfs: The Lost Village	"You Will Always Find Me in Your Heart"	Christopher Lennertz & KT Tunstall
(2018); 9th
(2018); 9th	Sherlock Gnomes	"Stronger Than I Ever Was"	Elton John and Bernie Taupin
(2018); 9th	Early Man	"Good Day"	New Hope Club
(2018); 9th	Peter Rabbit	"I Promise You"	Ezra Koenig
(2018); 9th	Smallfoot	"Finally Free"	Niall Horan
(2019); 10th
(2019); 10th	Abominable	"Beautiful Life"	Bebe Rexha (songwriter/performer); Nicholas Black, David Saint Fleur, Christopher Tempest, Samuel James Zammarelli (songwriters)
(2019); 10th	The Addams Family	"Haunted Heart"	Christina Aguilera (songwriter/performer); Antonina Armato, Tim James (songwriters)
(2019); 10th	Frozen 2	"Into the Unknown"	Kristen Anderson-Lopez, Robert Lopez (songwriters); Idina Menzel (performer)
(2019); 10th	How to Train Your Dragon: The Hidden World	"Together From Afar"	Jónsi (songwriter/performer); John Powell (songwriter)
(2019); 10th	Klaus	"Invisible"	Jussi Ilmari Karvinen, Caroline Pennell, Justin Tranter (songwriters); Zara Larsson (performer)
(2019); 10th	The Secret Life of Pets 2	"It's Gonna Be a Lovely Day"	Aminé, LunchMoney Lewis (songwriters/performers); Nathan Cunningham, Brandon Hamlin, Skip Scarborough, Marc Sibley, Bill Withers (songwriters)

=== 2020s ===
Year	Film	Song	Nominees
(2020); 11th
(2020); 11th	Trolls World Tour	"Just Sing"	Max Martin, Justin Timberlake, Ludwig Göransson, Sarah Aarons (writers)
(2020); 11th	The Croods: A New Age	"Feel the Thunder"	Haim (writers/performers); Ariel Rechtshaid (writer)
(2020); 11th	The One and Only Ivan	"Free"	Diane Warren (writer), Charlie Puth (performer)
(2020); 11th	Onward	"Carried Me with You"	Brandi Carlile (writer/performer); Phil and Tim Hanseroth (writers)
(2020); 11th	Over the Moon	"Rocket to the Moon"	Christopher Curtis, Marjorie Duffield, Helen Park (writers); Cathy Ang (performer)
(2020); 11th	Two by Two: Overboard!	"Stand for Hope (When I Stand with You)"	Eímear Noone (writer), Sibéal (performer)
(2021); 12th
(2021); 12th	PAW Patrol: The Movie	"Good Mood"	Adam Levine (writer/performer); Oscar Görres, Savan Kotecha, Karl Johan Schuster (writers)
(2021); 12th	Arlo the Alligator Boy	"Follow Me Home"	Ryan Crego & Alex Geringas (writers); Mary Lambert & Michael J. Woodard (performers)
(2021); 12th	The Boss Baby: Family Business	"Together We Stand"	Gary Barlow (writer); Ariana Greenblatt (performer)
(2021); 12th	The Mitchells vs. the Machines	"On My Way"	Alex Lahey (writer/producer/performer), Gab Strum (writer/producer), Sophie Payten (writer)
(2021); 12th	Sing 2	"Your Song Saved My Life"	U2 (writer/performer)
(2021); 12th	Spirit Untamed	"Fearless (Valiente)"	Amie Doherty (writer); Eiza González & Isabela Merced (performers)
(2022); 13th
(2022); 13th	Guillermo del Toro's Pinocchio	"Ciao Papa"	Alexandre Desplat; Lyrics by Roeben Katz and Guillermo del Toro (writers); Gregory Mann (performer)
(2022); 13th	The Bob's Burgers Movie	"Sunny Side Up Summer"	Loren Bouchard and Nora Smith (writers); Dan Mintz, Eugene Mirman, H. Jon Benjamin, John Roberts, and Kristen Schaal (performers)
(2022); 13th	Turning Red	"Nobody Like U"	Billie Eilish and Finneas O'Connell (writers); 4*TOWN (Finneas O'Connell, Grayson Villanueva, Jordan Fisher, Josh Levi, and Topher Ngo) (performers)
(2022); 13th	My Father's Dragon	"Lift Your Wings"	Mychael Danna, Jeff Danna, Frank Danna, Nora Twomey, Meg LeFauve (writers); Anohni (performers)
(2022); 13th	Minions: The Rise of Gru	"Turn Up the Sunshine"	Jack Antonoff, Kevin Parker, Sam Dew, Patrik Berger (writers); Diana Ross and Tame Impala (performers)
(2023); 14th
(2023); 14th	Trolls Band Together	"Better Place"	Shellback, Justin Timberlake, and Amy Allen (writers); NSYNC (performers)
(2023); 14th	Elemental	"Steal the Show"	Ari Leff, Michael Matosic, and Thomas Newman (writers); LAUV (performer)
(2023); 14th	PAW Patrol: The Mighty Movie	"Down Like That"	Bryson Tiller, Chantry Johnson, Michelle Zarlenga, and Charlie Heath (writers); Bryson Tiller (performers)
(2023); 14th	Spider-Man: Across the Spider-Verse	"Am I Dreaming"	Mike Dean, Peter Lee Johnson, Rakim Mayers, Roisee, Landon Wayne, and Leland Wayne (writers); A$AP Rocky, Metro Boomin, and Roisee (performers)
(2023); 14th	The Super Mario Bros. Movie	"Peaches"	Jack Black, John Spiker, Eric Osmond, Michael Jelenic, and Aaron Horvath (writers); Jack Black (performer)
(2023); 14th	Wish	"This Wish"	Julia Michaels, Benjamin Rice, and JP Saxe (writers); Ariana DeBose (performer)
(2024); 15th
(2024); 15th	The Wild Robot	"Kiss the Sky"	Maren Morris, Ali Tamposi, Michael Pollack, Delacey, Jordan Johnson & Stefan Johnson (writers); Maren Morris (performer)
(2024); 15th	Moana 2	"Beyond"	Lyrics by Abigail Barlow and Emily Bear (writers); Auli'i Cravalho (performer)
(2024); 15th	Moana 2	"Can I Get a Chee Hoo?"	Abigail Barlow & Emily Bear (writers); Dwayne Johnson (performer)
(2024); 15th	Despicable Me 4	"Double Life"	Pharrell Williams (writer and performer)
(2024); 15th	Thelma the Unicorn	"Just As You Are"	Taura Stinson, Darien Dorsey & Brittany Howard (writers); Brittany Howard (performer)
(2025); 16th
(2025); 16th	KPop Demon Hunters	"Golden"	Ejae, Mark Sonnenblick, Joong Gyu Kwak, Yu Han Lee, Hee Dong Nam, Jeong Hoon Seo, and Park Hong Jun (writers); Ejae, Audrey Nuna, and Rei Ami (performers)
(2025); 16th	Snoopy Presents: A Summer Musical	"Best Time Ever"	Alan Zachary, Michael Weiner and Jeff Morrow (writers); cast (performers)
(2025); 16th	The Bad Guys 2	"Goodlife"	Daniel Pemberton, Gary Go and Sanele David Sydow (writers); Rag'n'Bone Man and WizTheMc (performers)
(2025); 16th	Gabby's Dollhouse: The Movie	"Kaleidoscope"	Joseph Chase Atkins (writer); Tehillah Alphonso and cast (performers)
(2025); 16th	The Twits	"Open the Door"	David Byrne and Hayley Williams (writers/performers)
(2025); 16th	Zootopia 2	"Zoo"	Ed Sheeran, Blake Slatkin and Shakira (writers); Shakira (performer)
(2026); 17th
(2026); 17th	Toy Story 5	"I Knew It, I Knew You"	Taylor Swift and Jack Antonoff (writers); Taylor Swift (performer)
(2026); 17th	Paw Patrol: The Dino Movie	"Bottle Up"	Ed Sheeran, Savan Kotecha, Johnny McDaid and Ilya Salmanzadeh (writers); The Backstreet Boys (performer)
(2026); 17th	Forgotten Island	"Brb"	Ryan Tedder and Gabriella Wilson (writers); H.E.R. and Liza Soberano (perfomers)
(2026); 17th	Steps	"Someone to Hold"	Justin Tranter (writer); Jennie (performer)
(2026); 17th	Wildwood	"The Better Part of Bravery"	Colin Meloy (writer); The Decemberists (performer)
