= Apartment 404 =

Korean television program

- Hangul: 아파트404
- RR: Apateu404
- MR: Ap'at'ŭ404
- Genre: Reality; Variety
- Country of origin: South Korea
- Original language: Korean
- No. of seasons: 1
- No. of episodes: 8 (list of episodes)

Production
- Producer: Jung Chul-min
- Running time: 100 minutes

Original release
- Network: tvN
- Release: February 23 – April 12, 2024

Apartment 404 (also stylized as Apartment404; Korean: 아파트404) is a South Korean mystery solving variety show that reenacts real-life events that occurred in apartment complexes throughout history. Cast members take on assigned roles, are divided into teams, and participate in mini-games while using their detective skills to solve each case. Produced by Jung Chul-min, known for his work on Sixth Sense and Running Man, the show airs on tvN. The first season premiered on Amazon Prime Video from February 23 to April 12, 2024.

== Cast ==
Cast Member	Season 1								Ref.
Cast Member	1	2	3	4	5	6	7	8	Ref.
Yoo Jae-suk	Main	Main	Main	Main	Main	Main	Main	Main	
Cha Tae-hyun	Main	Main	Main	Main	Main	Main	Main	Main	
Lee Jung-ha	Main	Main	Main		Main	Main	Main	Main	
Jennie Kim (Blackpink)	Main	Main	Main	Main	Main	Main	Main	Main	
Oh Na-ra	Main	Main	Main	Main	Main	Main	Main	Main	
Yang Se-chan	Main	Main	Main	Main	Main	Main	Main		
Im Woo-il	Guest	Guest	Guest	Guest	Guest	Guest	Guest	Guest	
Choi Yeon-jun				Guest				Guest	
Aiki (Hook)							Guest		
DickPunks							Guest		
Jo Se-ho								Guest	
Kim Si-eun								Guest	

== Reception ==
Apartment 404 received mixed reviews from a variety of South Korean audiences. Viewers have criticised its lack of originality, citing the need for stronger game setups and improved editing. While Apartment 404 borrows elements from successful programs like Running Man and The Sixth Sense, critics agree the programme has struggled to establish a distinct identity. Additionally, concerns have been raised about the integration of new cast members, like Cha Tae-hyun, and whether they complement the existing team dynamic. There has also been speculation about Yoo Jae-seok's role as a national MC, with some questioning whether the show's lukewarm domestic reception could impact his standing, but "considering his track record of improving other programs", he should be given the opportunity to enhance Apartment 404.

Despite domestic critique, the show has achieved notable international success, topping the Amazon Prime Video TV Show category in 21 countries and regions, according to Flix Patrol, a global OTT viewing ranking site. It continues to garner attention, surpassing 20 million views on related content within three days of each episode's release. In terms of total viewership, the has show amassed over 110 million views, indicating sustained global interest. Internationally, the show ranked in the top 10 on Amazon Prime Video in various countries and regions. It also received attention at MIPTV, a prominent TV and video program market.

== Ratings ==
- Ratings listed below are the individual corner ratings of Apartment 404. (Note: Individual corner ratings do not include commercial time, which regular ratings include.)
- In the ratings below, the highest rating for the show will be in red and the lowest rating for the show will be in blue.
List of ratings (episode 1–8)

Apartment 404 : South Korea viewers per episode (thousands)

Episode	Episode number								Average
Episode	1	2	3	4	5	6	7	8	Average
1–8	763	629	529	593	456	435	398	421	528

Source: Audience measurement performed nationwide by Nielsen Media Research.

Ep. #	Original Airdate	AGB Nielsen (Nationwide)
1	February 23	2.746%
2	March 1	2.124%
3	March 8	1.720%
4	March 15	1.716%
5	March 22	1.469%
6	March 29	1.499%
7	April 5	1.263%
8	April 12	1.349%
