= Steps (film) =

2026 Netflix animated film

- Release poster
- Directed by: Alyce Tzue; John Ripa
- Screenplay by: Ava Tramer; James Madejski; Jen Chuck; Dana Schwartz; Felicia Ho
- Story by: Ava Tramer; James Madejski; Dana Schwartz; Felicia Ho; Riki Lindhome; Kate Micucci
- Based on: Cinderella by Charles Perrault
- Produced by: Amy Poehler; Jane Hartwell; Kim Lessing
- Starring: Ali Wong; Amanda Seyfried; Stephanie Hsu; Nikki Glaser; Daniel Radcliffe; Young Mazino; Peter Dinklage; Bette Midler
- Edited by: Noah Cody; Garret Elkins
- Music by: Kris Bowers (score); Justin Tranter (songs)
- Production companies: Netflix Animation Studios; Paper Kite Productions
- Distributed by: Netflix
- Release date: November 20, 2026
- Running time: 102 minutes
- Country: United States
- Language: English

Steps is a 2026 American animated musical fantasy comedy film directed by Alyce Tzue and John Ripa, loosely based on the fairy tale Cinderella from an idea by the Garfunkel and Oates duo Riki Lindhome and Kate Micucci. It stars the voices of Ali Wong, Amanda Seyfried, Stephanie Hsu, Nikki Glaser, Daniel Radcliffe, Young Mazino, Peter Dinklage, and Bette Midler. The film was released on Netflix on November 20, 2026. It received mixed-to-positive reviews from critics.

== Plot ==
In the kingdom of Allouette, a young Lilith LeGrand moves into her stepfather Edmund's home with her mother Lei Mi and sister Margot. Initially befriending her stepsister Cinderella, Lilith grows resentful when Cinderella fails to rescue them after her rival Priscilla traps her and Margot in a storm drain. Following Edmund's death, Lilith becomes an outsider while Cinderella earns sympathy from others.

Ten years later, Lilith has grown increasingly irritated by Cinderella’s constant cleaning, singing and overall cheerfulness. While preparing for a royal ball, Cinderella discovers Lilith accidentally wearing and tearing her late mother's dress. Following her outside to apologize, Lilith witnesses a Fairy Godmother magically transform Cinderella for the occasion. Deducing that the Fairy Godmother's magic has been influencing events in Cinderella's life, Lilith steals her wand and uses it to attend the ball alongside Margot.

At the ball, Cinderella captivates the Prince, overshadowing Priscilla, who retaliates by stealing the wand, transforming Margot into a frog and reducing Cinderella's gown to rags. As the sisters flee, Cinderella loses her glass slipper, which the Prince discovers and vows to return to its owner. Exploiting his inability to recognize faces, Priscilla magically alters her feet to fit the slipper and secures his marriage proposal.

Seeking help, the sisters visit the Fairy Godmother, who reveals that Cinderella's predetermined fairytale has been disrupted, threatening the kingdom. To restore their destiny, they must have the Prince place Cinderella's other slipper on her foot to reverse time before midnight, while Margot risks becoming a frog permanently.

During their journey, Lilith and Cinderella gradually begin to bond, while encountering Gef, a handsome troll who shares Lilith's feeling of isolation. However, tensions escalate when Gef seemingly steals the slipper, prompting an argument in which Cinderella admits that her compulsive cheerfulness conceals grief over her parents' death and her strained relationship with Lilith. Meanwhile, Priscilla discovers the Prince's suspicions of her deception and transforms him and the kingdom's inhabitants into porcelain dolls under her control.

After escaping Priscilla's henchmen including their leader Roderick, Lilith and Cinderella reunite with Gef and return to Alloutte, where they become trapped in the same storm drain that tainted their childhood friendship. There, Lilith admits envying Cinderella's universal affection, while Cinderella apologizes for not being there for her. Reconciled, they escape with Gef's assistance.

Together, they infiltrate Priscilla's wedding and restore the Prince who places the slipper on Cinderella right before midnight, activating its magic and allowing Cinderella to travel back in time. Before she departs, Lilith finally expresses her love for her stepsister.

Rather than returning to the ball, Cinderella travels ten years into the past and rescues Lilith and Margot from Priscilla, preventing their estrangement. In the altered timeline, the sisters grow up happily and even befriend Priscilla, Li Mei establishes a successful dressmaking business, Cinderella and the Prince fall in love again, Lilith reunites with Gef at the ball and they all celebrate with newfound appreciation.

== Voice cast ==
- Ali Wong as Lilith, the gothic and rebellious misunderstood stepsister of Cinderella
  - Chloe Kuo as Young Lilith
- Amanda Seyfried as Cinderella, the cheerful and kindhearted stepsister of Lilith and Margot
  - Emma Jagger as Young Cinderella
- Stephanie Hsu as Margot, Lilith's sister and Cinderella's other stepsister who is accidentally turned into a frog
  - Luna Hamilton as Young Margot
- Nikki Glaser as Priscilla, a vain and cruel girl who tries to marry the Prince and take over the kingdom of Alouette with the Fairy Godmother's stolen magic wand
  - Sofia Mortera as Young Priscilla
- Daniel Radcliffe as The Prince, the charming heir to the throne and Cinderella's love interest
- Young Mazino as Gef, a young, handsome troll outcast and inventor and Lilith's love interest
- Peter Dinklage as Roderick, Priscilla's butler, surrogate father and henchman who is ordered to eliminate Cinderella and her stepsisters
- Bette Midler as The Fairy Godmother
- Gwendoline Yeo as Li Mei, a dressmaker and Lilith and Margot's mother and Cinderella's stepmother
- Matt Lowe as Edmund, Cinderella's father and Lilith and Margot's stepfather
- Luis "Damian Priest" Martínez as Cracktor, a troll and Gef's older brother
- LaNisa Renee Frederick as Painterazzi
- Jordyn Weitz as Sara
- Bruce Nozick as Herald

== Production ==
=== Development and casting ===
The film was first announced in March 2021 with Alyce Tzue (director of the short film Soar) set to direct a Cinderella-based story based on a concept by Garfunkel and Oates duo Riki Lindhome and Kate Micucci. It would be co-produced by Amy Poehler's production company Paper Kite Productions. More details were revealed in December 2025 with John Ripa, who co-directed Raya and the Last Dragon, joining as co-director with Tzue along with Ali Wong and Stephanie Hsu voicing the step-sisters Lilith and Margot.

In April 2026, it was announced that Amanda Seyfried would voice Cinderella while Riki Lindhome's stage play Dead Inside revealed that Netflix had dropped her from the project as well as removing all the songs she had written. The following month, it was announced that Bette Midler would be voicing The Fairy Godmother. On June 17, 2026, it was announced that Nikki Glaser would be voicing the main antagonist, Priscilla. In July 2026, it was announced that Daniel Radcliffe, Young Mazino, and Peter Dinklage would join the cast.

=== Animation ===
The film's animation was provided by Netflix Animation Studios' in-house offices in Burbank, Sydney and Vancouver. In terms of visual design, the rococo aesthetic of pre-Revolutionary France served as an inspiration. The filmmakers decided to embrace the three-dimensional look of computer animation rather than using 2D textures or a painterly style, creating what they described as a "maximalist look."

== Music ==
In August 2026, Kris Bowers was announced to be scoring the film. In October, it was announced that the soundtrack, written and composed by Justin Tranter, would feature four original songs. Jennie leads the soundtrack with "Someone to Hold", while Emei performs "The Understudy", Rose Gray performs "Meet Me on the Dance Floor", and Amanda Seyfried performs "Smile and a Song".

== Release ==
Steps was released on Netflix on November 20, 2026.

== Reception ==
On the review aggregator website Rotten Tomatoes, 77% of 26 critics' reviews are positive, with an average rating of 6.3/10. Metacritic, which uses a weighted average, assigns the film a score of 53 out of 100, based on 10 critics, indicating "mixed or average" reviews.
