= Someone to Hold (Jennie song) =

2026 single by Jennie

Single by Jennie

from the album Steps (Soundtrack from the Netflix Film)
- Released: November 6, 2026
- Genre: Dance-pop
- Label: Netflix Music
- Songwriters: Justin Tranter; Julia Michaels; Jason Gill
- Producers: Justin Tranter; Jason Gill

Jennie singles chronology
"Fallen Angel" (2026)	"Someone to Hold" (2026)

Music video
- "Someone to Hold" on YouTube

"Someone to Hold" is a song by South Korean singer and rapper Jennie. It was released through Netflix Music on November 6, 2026, as the lead single from the soundtrack album to the animated musical fantasy comedy film Steps (2026). The song was written by Justin Tranter, Jason Gill and Julia Michaels, with the former two handling the production. It is a ballad inspired by vintage disco-pop with neo-disco production and lyrics about the sisterhood between the film's main characters Lilith, Cinderella and Margot. It received a nomination in the Song – Animated Film category at the 17th Hollywood Music in Media Awards.

== Background and release ==
On October 15, 2026, Netflix announced that Jennie would headline the soundtrack to the animated film Steps with a new song, "Someone to Hold". A preview of the song was featured in the film's main trailer, released the same day. In a press release, Jennie said that she enjoyed working on the song, her first for an animated film, and appreciated the personalities of the film's characters. The song was released on November 6, ahead of the film and its accompanying soundtrack on November 20.

== Composition and lyrics ==
"Someone to Hold" was written by Justin Tranter, Jason Gill, and Julia Michaels, and produced by the former two. It is a powerful ballad featuring a melodic neo-disco production with strings, bass, and layers of Jennie's vocals. Tranter described the song as "pure danceable joy" inspired by vintage dance-pop. According to the film's directors Alyce Tzue and John Ripa, it is a "bright and spirited" track that represents the sisterhood between the characters Lilith, Cinderella and Margot and gives the film a sense of energy and positivity. The ballad captures the sisters' bond and accompanies an emotional crescendo in the film.

== Accolades ==
Awards and nominations
Year	Organisation	Award	Result	Ref.
2026	Hollywood Music in Media Awards	Song – Animated Film	Nominated	

== Credits and personnel ==
Credits adapted from Tidal.

- Jennie – vocals
- Justin Tranter – songwriter, producer
- Jason Gill – songwriter, producer
- Julia Michaels – songwriter
- Chris Gehringer – mastering engineer
- Serban Ghenea – mix engineer

== Charts ==
Chart performance
Chart (2026)	Peak position
New Zealand Hot Singles (RMNZ)	36
South Korea Download (Circle)	50

== Release history ==
Release dates and formats
Region	Date	Format	Label	Ref.
Various	November 6, 2026	Digital download; streaming	Netflix Music	
