= Spot! =

Single by Zico featuring Jennie
- Language: Korean; English
- Released: April 26, 2024
- Genre: Hip-hop
- Length: 2:47
- Label: KOZ
- Songwriters: Zico; Eun Hee-young; No Identity
- Producers: Zico; Eun Hee-young; No Identity

Zico singles chronology
"Freak" (2022)	"Spot!" (2024)	"Eko Eko" (2025)

Jennie singles chronology
"Slow Motion" (2024)	"Spot!" (2024)	"Mantra" (2024)

Music video
- "Spot!" on YouTube

"Spot!" is a song by South Korean rapper Zico featuring South Korean singer and rapper Jennie. It was released through KOZ Entertainment on April 26, 2024. "Spot!" is a hip-hop song written and produced by Zico, Eun Hee-young and No Identity, with lyrics about a casual encounter between two friends at a late-night party.

"Spot!" received critical acclaim for its catchy hook and the combination of the artists' unique styles. It was commercially successful in South Korea, where it peaked at number one on the Circle Digital Chart and became Zico's seventh and Jennie's second chart-topper respectively. Globally, the song debuted at number eight on the Billboard Global Excl. US, marking Zico's first ever entry and Jennie's third top-ten hit on the chart. It became Zico's first and Jennie's second number-one song on the US Billboard World Digital Songs chart, and entered the top ten in Hong Kong, Malaysia, Singapore, and Taiwan.

An accompanying music video was uploaded to YouTube simultaneously with the single's release. Directed by Yongseok Choi and Ran Ro, the video features Zico and Jennie on a late-night drive, with Zico rapping in various urban settings, and ends with a lively group dance. Zico promoted the song with performances at various festivals, his show The Seasons: Zico's Artist, the 45th Blue Dragon Film Awards, and with Jennie at his concert Zico Live: Join The Parade. "Spot!" received several accolades, including Best Collaboration and Best Rap & Hip Hop Performance at the 2024 MAMA Awards.

== Background and release ==
After completing his military conscription in May 2022, Zico made his return to music with the release of his fourth extended play, Grown Ass Kid, on July 27, which contained the pre-release single "Seoul Drift" and title track "Freak". Meanwhile, Jennie departed from her label YG Entertainment and formed her own record label for solo activities in November 2023 named Odd Atelier. A representative from Zico's agency, KOZ Entertainment, confirmed on April 2, 2024, that the rapper was preparing a new song to be released at the end of the month, celebrating the tenth anniversary of his solo debut. Local news outlet TenAsia reported on April 4 that Jennie would feature on the song and appear in its music video. In response to the reports, KOZ Entertainment confirmed Zico's comeback but not Jennie's involvement, stating that "it is difficult to confirm other matters."

On April 18, Zico posted a 20-second video on social media of him and Jennie in a recording studio singing and dancing along to a snippet of their upcoming single featuring her vocals. Shortly afterwards, he posted another photo teaser captioned "Come vibe with us" of the two artists looking at Polaroid pictures of themselves. Zico then officially revealed the new collaboration titled "Spot!" and its release date of April 26, alongside a schedule of teaser photos and videos from April 19 to 25. On the 19th, he uploaded a behind the scenes video of the song's recording in the studio with Jennie. "Spot!" was made available for digital download and streaming on April 26 as a digital single through KOZ Entertainment.

== Recording and composition ==
"Spot!" is a hip-hop song that opens with Jennie singing the hook. Its lyrics revolve around the special moment between two friends who happen to meet at a party late at night. In a press release, Zico expressed that the "charm of this single lies in its simple arrangement that evokes listeners' excitement and desire to have fun." On Jennie's contribution, he elaborated that she "poured her heart and soul into the recording process. She demonstrated professionalism by suggesting editing even when I complimented the sound. Jennie played a significant role in perfecting this track. The enjoyable collaboration has seen positive results."

== Critical reception ==
Professional ratings
Review scores
Source	Rating
IZM	4/5 stars

"Spot!" was met with acclaim from music critics and was listed by several publications as one of the best K-pop songs of the year. IZM's Park Soo-jin scored the song four out of five stars and described it as a surefire "hit song" that was "full of momentum" with "countless punch lines". He praised Zico's "refined" musical taste with the use of strong electronic sounds in the latter half of the song, as well as Jennie's "satisfying" feature. Writing for Billboard, Jeff Benjamin named it the 20th best K-pop song of 2024 and one of the most "dynamic collaborations" of the year, managing to blend Zico and Jennie's "distinctive styles". He further lauded the song's "catchy hooks and clever lyrics", which he felt could only be pulled off by the "charismatic" duo. Similarly, Daniel Anderson included "Spot!" on NME's list of the 15 best K-pop songs of 2024, describing it as a "supremely groovy bop" and a "summertime jam to blast on repeat." In particular, he praised Jennie for her performance on the infectious hook, in which she shows off "a delicious trill that reminds everyone of her powerhouse vocal versatility."

== Accolades ==
"Spot!" won two first-place trophies on the South Korean music program Inkigayo on May 12 and 19. It also won the Melon Popularity Award on May 6, 2024.

Awards and nominations for "Spot!"
Year	Organization	Award	Result	Ref.
2024	Asian Pop Music Awards	Best Collaboration (Overseas)	Nominated	
2024	BreakTudo Awards	K-pop Hit of the Year	Nominated	
2024	Korea Grand Music Awards	Best Hip-Hop	Nominated	
2024	MAMA Awards	Best Collaboration	Won	
2024	MAMA Awards	Best Rap & Hip Hop Performance	Won	
2024	MAMA Awards	Song of the Year	Nominated	
2024	Melon Music Awards	Millions Top 10	Nominated	
2025	Golden Disc Awards	Best Digital Song (Bonsang)	Nominated	

Music program awards
Program	Date	Ref.
Inkigayo	May 12, 2024	
Inkigayo	May 19, 2024	

== Commercial performance ==
"Spot!" debuted at number 24 on the Billboard Global 200 with 47 million streams and 5,000 downloads worldwide. It also debuted at number eight on the Billboard Global Excl. US with 44.5 million streams and 4,000 sold outside the US. The song marked Zico's first-ever entry on the chart, and Jennie's third top-ten hit as a soloist, after "You & Me" topped the chart in October 2023 and "One of the Girls" reached number five in February 2024. In the United States, "Spot!" sold 1,000 copies and registered 2.5 million streams during its initial tracking week. The song debuted at number one on the Billboard World Digital Song Sales chart, marking Zico's first-ever number-one on any US sales chart. It was Jennie's second time topping the chart, after her debut single "Solo" in 2018.

In South Korea, "Spot!" debuted at number 22 on the Circle Digital Chart for the week of April 27 with only two days of tracking. The following week dated May 4, it ascended to number two on the overall chart and number one on the component streaming chart. "Spot!" remained atop the streaming chart for three consecutive weeks. In its fourth week, the song rose to its peak at number one on the Circle Digital Chart, becoming Zico's seventh and Jennie's second chart-topper. It also ranked as the number-one song on the monthly Circle Digital Chart for May. On Billboard's South Korea Songs, "Spot!" debuted at number one and remained atop the chart for three consecutive weeks, earning Zico his first and Jennie her second number-one single on the chart.

== Music video ==
A scene in the music video where Zico and Jennie go on a late-night drive.

The music video for "Spot!" was directed by Yongseok Choi and Ran Ro of the video production company Lumpens. A 19-second music video teaser was released on April 25 followed by the official video a day later, which was uploaded to Hybe Labels' official YouTube channel on April 26 at 6 PM Korean time. Upon release, the video topped the worldwide trending list on YouTube and exceeded five million views in five hours.

In the music video, Zico and Jennie aim to create a hip atmosphere without relying on flashy effects. Zico sings while locking eyes with Jennie, and together, they take viewers on a late-night drive, exuding their "true vibe." Throughout the video, Zico showcases his dynamic performance, rapping passionately in various settings such as studios, soccer fields, parking lots, and urban streets. The video concludes with an enticing group dance featuring numerous dancers.

== Live performances ==
To promote the song, Zico and Jennie filmed a short-form dance challenge video together that was released on their social media platforms. On April 26, Zico made his debut televised performance of "Spot!", which was pre-recorded before the single's release as a part of his first episode hosting the South Korean late-night music talk show The Seasons: Zico's Artist. He performed the song at various South Korean university festivals throughout May, including the Soonchunhyang University festival "2024 Phoenixia" on the 8th and "Akarakareul Onnuri with Alumni" hosted by the Yonsei University Alumni Association and Cheerleading Squad on May 26. He also performed at the Hip Hop Playa Festival 2024 at Nanji Hangang Park on May 4, Waterbomb Seoul 2024 on July 5, and the 2024 Beer Rock Music Festival in Kaohsiung, Taiwan on July 7.

On November 24, 2024, Jennie made a surprise appearance for an encore performance of the song with Zico right after he performed it solo at the second day of his Zico Live: Join The Parade concert at Olympic Hall in Songpa District, Seoul. This marked the first time both artists performed the song live together. On November 29, Zico performed "Artist" and "Spot!" at the 45th Blue Dragon Film Awards.

== Credits and personnel ==
- Zico – vocals, background vocals, songwriter, producer
- Jennie – vocals, background vocals
- Eun Hee-young – background vocals, songwriter, producer, recording engineer
- No Identity – songwriter, producer
- Kim Joon-sang – recording engineer
- Staytuned – mixing engineer
- Park Nam-joon – assistant mixing engineer
- Nam‐woo Kwon – mastering engineer

== Charts ==
=== Weekly charts ===
Weekly chart performance
Chart (2024)	Peak position
Australia Digital Tracks (ARIA)	36
Australia Hitseekers (ARIA)	6
China (TME Korean)	5
Global 200 (Billboard)	24
Hong Kong (Billboard)	2
Indonesia (Billboard)	12
Japan Hot 100 (Billboard)	69
Japan Heatseekers (Billboard Japan)	3
Malaysia International (RIM)	6
New Zealand Hot Singles (RMNZ)	5
Singapore (RIAS)	5
South Korea (Circle)	1
Taiwan (Billboard)	2
UK Singles Downloads (Official Charts)	44
UK Singles Sales (OCC)	51
US World Digital Song Sales (Billboard)	1

=== Monthly charts ===
Monthly chart performance
Chart (2024)	Position
South Korea (Circle)	1

=== Year-end charts ===
Year-end chart performance
Chart	Year	Position
South Korea (Circle)	2024	19
South Korea (Circle)	2025	126

== Release history ==
Release dates and formats
Region	Date	Format	Label	Ref.
Various	April 26, 2024	Digital download; streaming	KOZ	

== See also ==
- List of Circle Digital Chart number ones of 2024
- List of Inkigayo Chart winners (2024)
- List of K-pop songs on the Billboard charts
