= Jennie (singer) =

South Korean singer (born 1996)

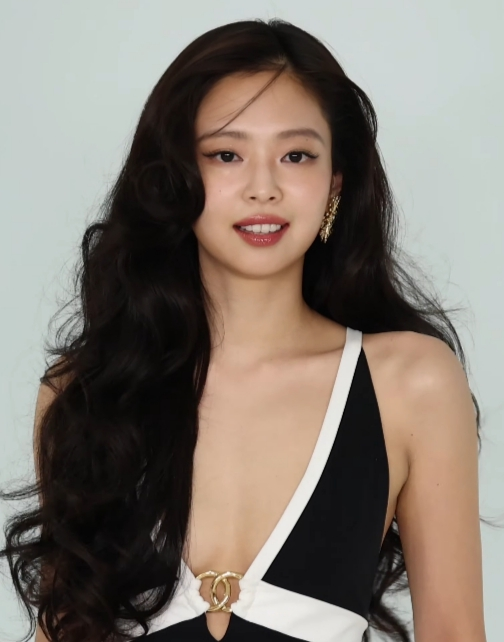
- Jennie in 2026
- Born: Jennie Kim; January 16, 1996 (age 30); Seongnam, Gyeonggi, South Korea
- Other name: Jennie Ruby Jane
- Occupations: Singer; rapper; songwriter; actress
- Organization: Odd Atelier
- Works: Discography (Note: For her work with Blackpink, see Blackpink discography, songs recorded, and videography.)
- Awards: Full list (Note: For her awards received as a member of Blackpink, see List of awards and nominations received by Blackpink.)
- Honours: Okgwan Order of Cultural Merit (2026)
- Musical career
- Genres: K-pop; dance-pop; hip-hop; R&B
- Instrument: Vocals
- Years active: 2012–2013; 2016–present
- Labels: YG; Interscope; Odd Atelier; Columbia; Alta Music
- Member of: Blackpink
- Website: jenn.ie

Korean name
- Hangul: 김제니
- RR: Gim Jeni
- MR: Kim Cheni

Jennie Kim (Korean: 김제니; born January 16, 1996) is a South Korean singer, rapper, songwriter, and actress. Born in South Korea, she moved to New Zealand in 2004 and returned to South Korea to successfully audition for YG Entertainment in 2010. She rose to prominence as a member of the South Korean girl group Blackpink, which debuted in August 2016 and became one of the best-selling girl groups of all time.

In November 2018, Jennie released her debut single "Solo", which topped South Korea's Circle Digital Chart and the US Billboard World Digital Songs chart; its music video was the first by a Korean female soloist to surpass one billion views on YouTube. Her follow-up single "You & Me" (2023) reached number one on the Billboard Global Excl. US chart. Jennie established her own label named Odd Atelier in 2023 and signed with Columbia Records in 2024. Her debut studio album, Ruby (2025), sold one million copies worldwide and tied for the highest position on the UK Albums Chart by a Korean solo artist. It entered the top ten of the US Billboard 200 and spawned the Billboard Global 200 top-five hits "Mantra" and "Like Jennie"; the latter reached number one in South Korea. In 2026, her collaboration "Dracula" with Tame Impala achieved the longest run by a Korean artist in the top ten of the US Billboard Hot 100.

Outside of music, Jennie made her acting debut under the stage name Jennie Ruby Jane in the 2023 HBO television series The Idol. Her accolades include two Korean Music Awards, four Golden Disc Awards, six MAMA Awards, three Melon Music Awards, and two Grammy Award nominations for Record of the Year and Best Pop Duo/Group Performance. She became the first solo artist to win the daesang (grand prize) for Record of the Year at the Melon Music Awards and Artist of the Year at the Golden Disc Awards, and the first Korean soloist to win a Billboard Women in Music Award. Jennie has appeared on Time's list of the 100 most influential people in the world (2026) and on the Forbes Korea Power Celebrity 40 (2025–2026). The most-followed Korean person on Instagram, she is a global ambassador for Chanel and Calvin Klein.

== Early life and education ==
Jennie Kim was born on January 16, 1996, an only child. She was initially reported to be born in Cheongdam-dong, a ward of Gangnam District, Seoul, but she revealed in episode three of Apartment 404 that she was actually born in Bundang in Seongnam. She attended Cheongdam Elementary School in Seoul before moving to New Zealand. When she was eight years old, she went on a trip with her family to Australia and New Zealand. When her mother asked her if she liked New Zealand and wanted to stay, Jennie replied, "Yes". One year later, she was sent to study at Waikowhai Intermediate School in Auckland and lived with a home-stay family. Jennie spoke about learning a new language on the MBC's documentary English, Must Change to Survive (2006). During her adolescent years, she dreamed of becoming a ballet dancer. After completing intermediate, she enrolled at ACG Parnell College.

Jennie first heard of K-pop while in New Zealand, particularly finding an interest in YG Entertainment's music. Her mother planned to move her to Florida in the United States at the age of 14 to continue her studies to become a lawyer or teacher, but she did not like the idea and was concerned about not finding work she liked while living alone. Her family supported her decision, and she moved back to South Korea in 2010, where she studied at Cheongdam Middle School. Jennie auditioned for YG Entertainment that same year, singing Rihanna's "Take a Bow", and joined the label as a trainee. Through High Cut Korea, she revealed because she was afraid of strangers and reluctant to take initiative, she could barely introduce herself during her audition. The company urged her to embrace the role of a rapper; most songs she covered included raps, and she was the only trainee fluent in English at the time. Along with her native Korean, she also knows basic Japanese and has learned French.

== Career ==
=== 2012–2017: Beginnings and debut with Blackpink ===
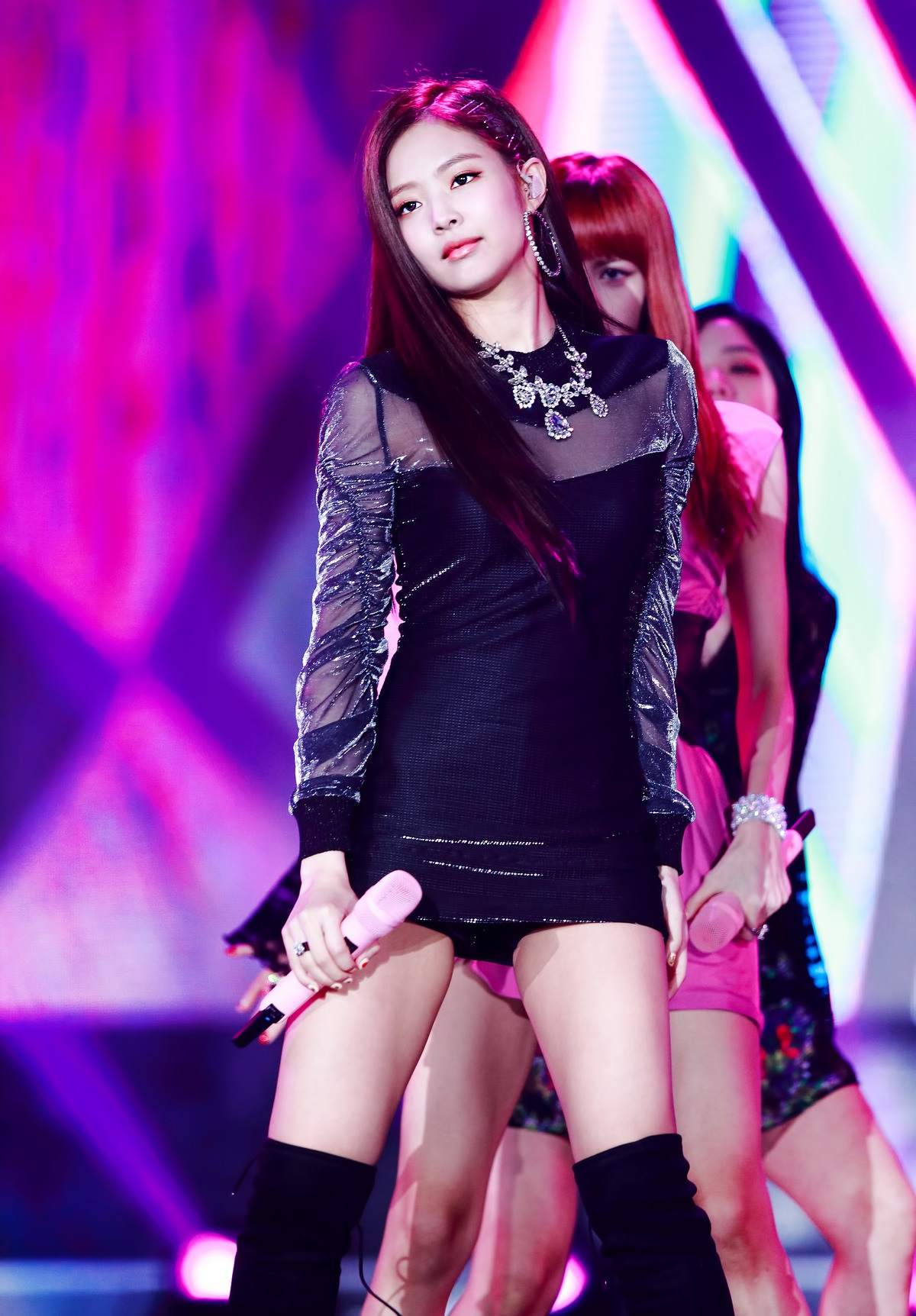
Jennie performing at the Korea Music Festival with Blackpink in October 2017

On April 10, 2012, Jennie was introduced through a photo titled "Who's that girl?" via the official blog of YG Entertainment. Her photograph soon became the most searched topic on portal sites under the name "Mystery Girl". On August 30, YG Entertainment released a YouTube video through their blog titled "YG Trainee - Jennie Kim", in which she covered B.o.B.'s song "Strange Clouds" featuring Lil Wayne. On September 1, Jennie made her first public appearance as the lead actress in G-Dragon's music video "That XX" from his extended play One of a Kind.

In January 2013, another video titled "Jennie Kim - YG New Artist", in which she covered the song "Lotus Flower Bomb" by rapper Wale, was released. In March, Lee Hi featured Jennie on her B-side track, "Special" from her debut album, First Love. In August, Jennie featured on Seungri's B-side track "GG Be" from his extended play Let's Talk About Love. In September, she featured on G-Dragon's B-side track "Black", recording the hook in less than five days before the release of his album Coup d'Etat. On September 8, she made her first stage appearance alongside G-Dragon on SBS' Inkigayo.

On June 1, 2016, Jennie was the first member to be revealed for YG Entertainment's newest girl group, its first in seven years since 2NE1. On August 8, 2016, she debuted as a member of Blackpink, alongside Jisoo, Rosé and Lisa, with the release of their single album Square One alongside double A-side singles "Boombayah" and "Whistle". According to band-mate Jisoo, Jennie was responsible for the general duties and decision making of the group. Jennie recounted her six-year experience as a trainee through V Live, stating each month a group, dance, and solo song were performed for the label's CEO, producers and artists to watch and evaluate the progress of their training. She also recalled memories preparing outfits and songs, making musical accompaniments, and practicing choreography. In 2018, Blackpink signed with Interscope Records in a global partnership with YG Entertainment.

=== 2018–2021: Rising popularity and solo debut ===
Jennie appeared with Blackpink member Jisoo on Running Man in July 2018. A video of Jennie crying after going through a horror room with Lee Kwang-soo went viral in South Korea, gaining over one million views on one site and a total of over three million views across multiple platforms, VODs, and social media. She was subsequently selected as one of the best variety stars of 2018 following her discovery on Running Man. Jennie was invited to the show again after attracting attention during her previous appearance. Jennie was said to have ranked first among casting choices and received multiple offers from different variety shows. On October 1, Jennie was confirmed to join as a cast member for SBS' new variety show Village Survival, the Eight, her first permanent casting in a television series.

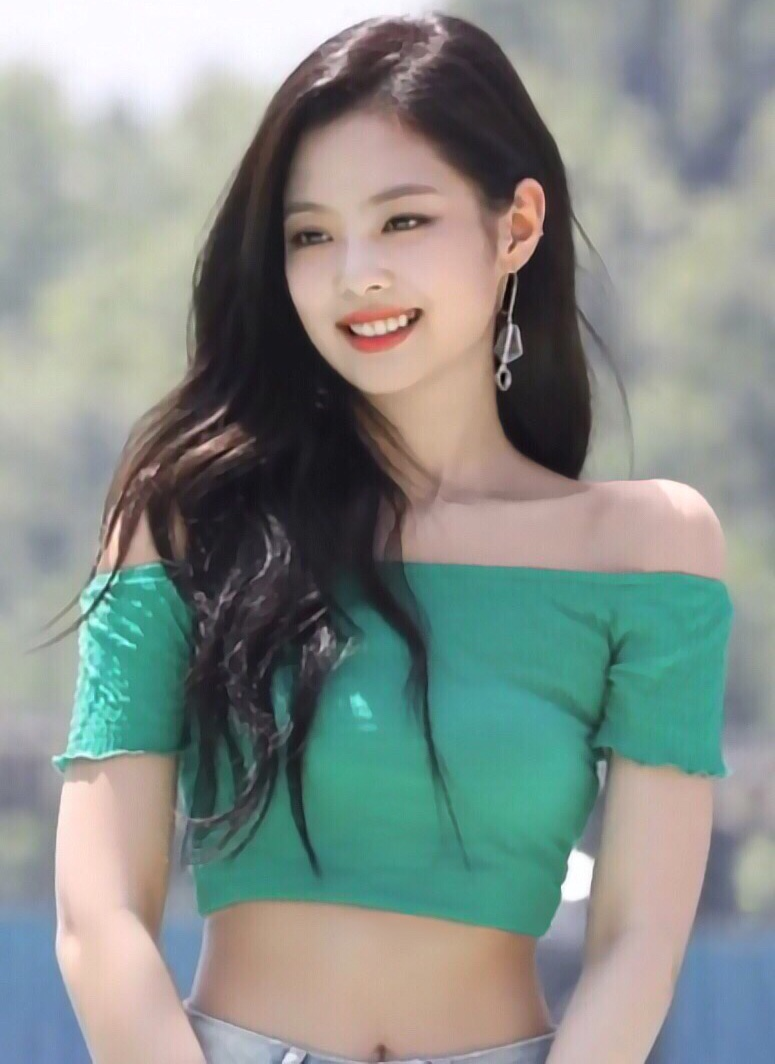
Jennie at the Sprite Waterbomb Festival in 2018

In mid-October 2018, an announcement of Jennie's official solo debut was made. Following a series of promotional teasers, it was revealed she would release a single album titled Solo with a lead single of the same name. In the midst of preparation for her debut, it was decided that her single "Solo" would first be revealed through Blackpink's In Your Area tour in Seoul on November 10, ahead of release two days later. The song was described as a hip-hop track with pop elements and was designed to showcase Jennie's sides as both a "delicate girl" and "independent woman". To promote the single, YG Entertainment aired the Jennie – 'Solo' Diary series on YouTube, sharing glimpses of her work throughout the promotion period of the single.

Upon release, "Solo" debuted on Gaon Music Chart at number one and achieved a triple crown for simultaneously topping the domestic digital, download, and streaming charts. The single remained on the digital and mobile charts for two further consecutive weeks and on the streaming chart for a further three consecutive weeks. "Solo" was certified platinum for streaming by the KMCA and soon won the Song of the Year award for the month of November at the eighth Gaon Chart Music Awards, as well as the Digital Bonsang award at the 34th Golden Disc Awards. Overseas, "Solo" topped the Billboard's World Digital Songs chart. At the time of release, the music video for "Solo" became the most viewed by a female Korean solo artist of all time within a 24 hour period on YouTube. Jennie also became the first and only female Korean solo artist to surpass 300 million views on the platform within six months of release. On November 25, Jennie received her first music show win as a solo artist on Inkigayo, and went on to receive a Triple Crown by winning three times.

On April 12 and 19, 2019, Jennie became the first Korean solo artist to perform at the Coachella Valley Music and Arts Festival, where she performed "Solo" during Blackpink's set at the festival. Her performance was included in "The 10 Best Things We Saw at Coachella 2019" list by Billboard, which called it "mind-blowing" and "stunning" for fans and casual passersby.

Jennie co-wrote the song "Lovesick Girls" for Blackpink, which was released on October 2, 2020, as the third single from the group's debut studio album, The Album. On January 31, 2021, Jennie performed a revamped version of "Solo" during Blackpink's livestream concert, The Show. The remix included a new rap verse written by Jennie and an extended tropical dance break.

=== 2022–2023: Acting debut and independent label ===
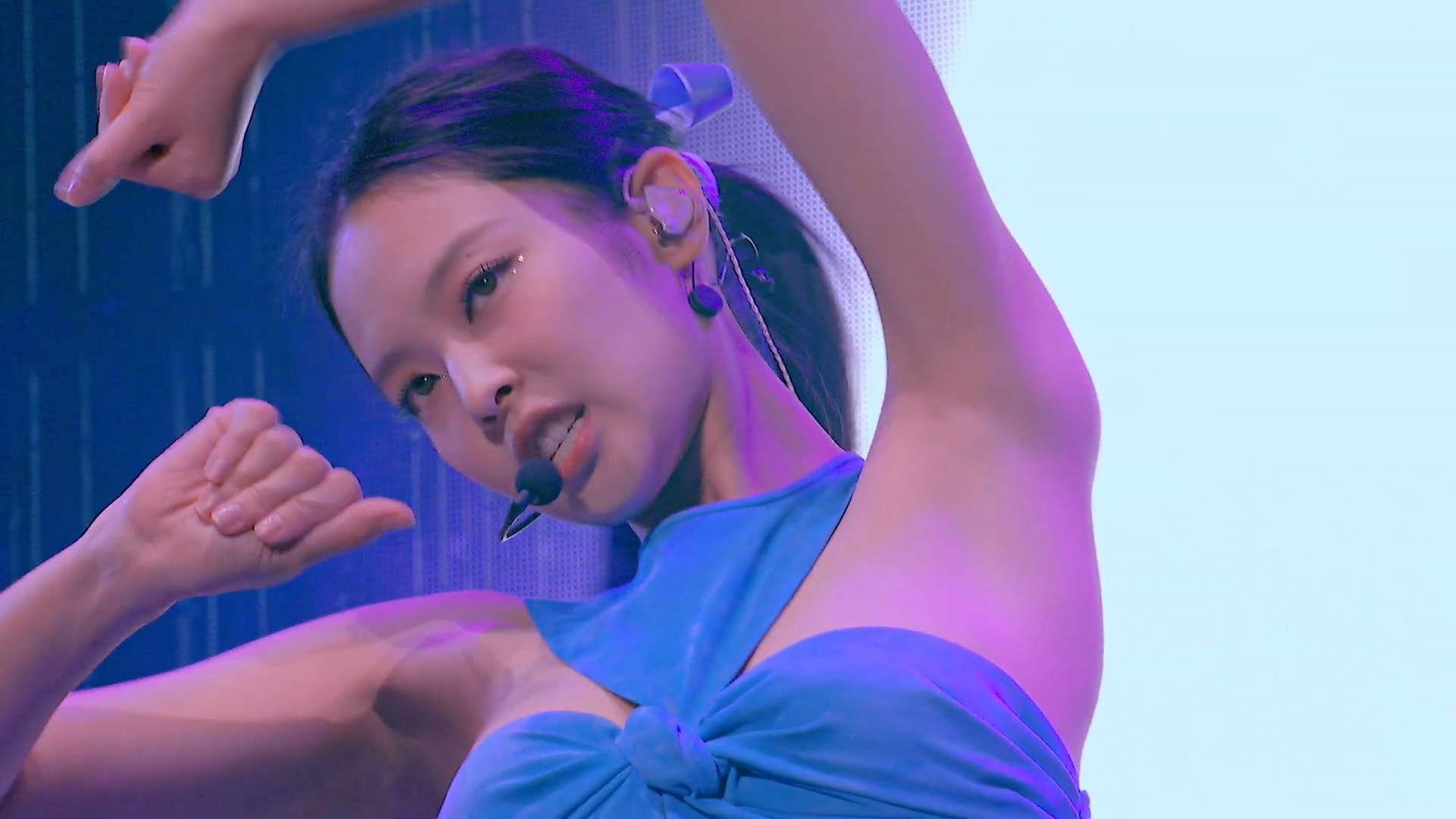
Jennie performing during the Born Pink World Tour in 2022

During Blackpink's Born Pink World Tour starting in October 2022, Jennie debuted a new solo song titled "You & Me". She performed a remixed version of the song with a new rap verse during Blackpink's setlist as the headlining act of Coachella in April 2023. On July 2, she performed this version of the song alongside "Solo" during Blackpink's headlining concert at BST Hyde Park in London.

In 2023, Jennie made her acting debut under the stage name Jennie Ruby Jane in the HBO television series The Idol, which was created by and starred Canadian singer the Weeknd. The show was critically panned and was cancelled after its first season. However, Jennie's role as Dyanne, a backup dancer and close friend to the pop star Jocelyn (played by Lily-Rose Depp), received praise, with a widely circulated clip of her in the show outviewing the premiere of the show on HBO. Jennie first teased a collaboration with the Weeknd for the soundtrack of The Idol by playing a snippet of the song at a launch party for her Calvin Klein capsule collection. The song, "One of the Girls" by the Weeknd, Jennie, and Lily-Rose Depp, was released on June 23 as part of the extended play The Idol Episode 4 (Music from the HBO Original Series).

Following the conclusion of the Born Pink World Tour, it was announced on October 4, 2023, that "You & Me" would be officially released as a special single two days later. The song debuted at number seven on the Billboard Global 200 and topped the Billboard Global Excl. US chart, becoming Jennie's first solo number-one song on the latter. It peaked at number four on South Korea's Circle Digital Chart, while in the United Kingdom, it debuted at number 39 on the UK Singles Chart and reached number one on the UK Singles Downloads Chart and UK Singles Sales Chart, making Jennie the first Korean female soloist to top those charts. On November 22, 2023, Jennie was invested by King Charles III as an Honorary Member of the Order of the British Empire (MBE) alongside her bandmates during a special investiture at Buckingham Palace, which was also attended by South Korean president Yoon Suk Yeol.

The song "One of the Girls" gained viral popularity on video sharing platform TikTok largely due to fans' support of Jennie's parts of the song. As a result, it was released for digital download and streaming as an official single on December 8 and subsequently sent to US rhythmic contemporary radio. The song became her first entry on the Billboard Hot 100 and peaked at number 51 in March 2024, breaking the record for the highest-charting song by a K-pop female soloist. It spent 20 weeks on the chart, surpassed 1 billion streams on Spotify, and made Jennie the first Korean female solo artist to receive a platinum certification from the Recording Industry Association of America (RIAA). In the United Kingdom, the song peaked at number 21 on the UK Singles Chart, making her the Blackpink member with the highest-charting solo material in the UK. It also reached number ten on the Billboard Global 200 and number seven on the Global Excl. US, becoming her second top-ten hit on both charts.

On December 6, YG Entertainment announced that Jennie, along with the other members of Blackpink, had renewed their contracts for group activities and that the members' individual contracts were still under discussion. On December 24, Jennie revealed that she founded her own record label, called Odd Atelier, in November 2023. YG Entertainment confirmed on December 29 that Jennie and the other Blackpink members agreed not to proceed with a contract with the label for individual activities.

=== 2024–present: Ruby and Fallen Angel ===
Jennie collaborated with American rapper Matt Champion of Brockhampton on the song "Slow Motion", which was released on March 8, 2024, and appeared on Champion's debut studio album, Mika's Laundry (2024). On April 26, she featured on South Korean rapper Zico's single "Spot!" and its music video. The song was commercially successful in South Korea and peaked at number one on the Circle Digital Chart, becoming Jennie's second chart-topping single after "Solo". Worldwide, it peaked at number eight on the Billboard Global Excl. US, where it became Zico's first-ever entry and Jennie's third top-ten hit. In the United States, it debuted at number one on the Billboard World Digital Song Sales chart, marking Zico's first-ever number-one on any US sales chart and Jennie's second chart-topper after "Solo". Jennie was the most-nominated and most-awarded soloist at the 2024 MAMA Awards, where she won four awards for Best Dance Performance Female Solo with "You & Me", Best Collaboration and Best Rap & Hip Hop Performance with "Spot!", and Fans' Choice Female Top 10.

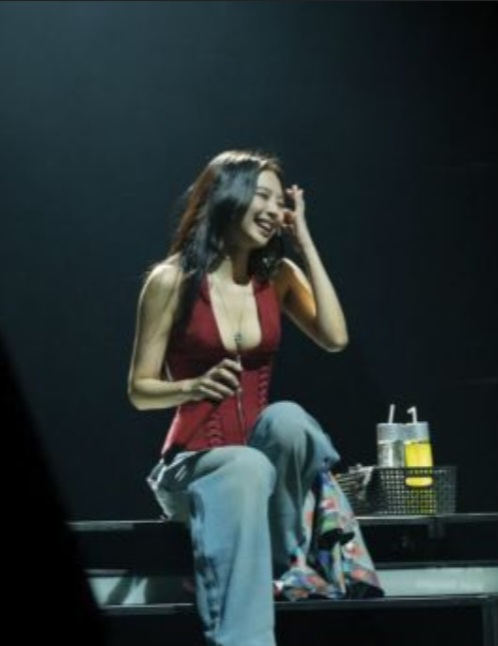
Jennie performing in Incheon for the Ruby Experience in 2025

On September 8, it was announced that Jennie had signed as a solo artist with Columbia Records in partnership with her label Odd Atelier. Jennie released "Mantra" on October 11 as the lead single from her debut studio album Ruby. The song debuted at number three on the Billboard Global 200 and number two on the Billboard Global Excl. US, becoming Jennie's third and fourth top-ten hit on the respective charts. It peaked at number three on South Korea's Circle Digital Chart and became her first solo entry on the US Billboard Hot 100. It also debuted at number 37 on the UK Singles Chart, breaking the record for the highest-charting UK single by a Korean female solo artist. After announcing Ruby, Jennie released the music video for the album track "Zen" on January 25, 2025. "Love Hangover" featuring Dominic Fike was subsequently released as the second single from the album on January 31. The album's third single, "ExtraL" featuring Doechii, was released on February 21.

Jennie's debut solo studio album Ruby was released on March 7, 2025, alongside its fourth single "Like Jennie". The album sold one million copies globally in the first week of release and entered the top 10 in 19 countries, including South Korea, Australia, and the United States. In the United Kingdom, Ruby debuted at number three on the UK Albums Chart, surpassing Rosé's Rosie as the highest-charting album by a female K-pop soloist on the chart and tying Jung Kook's Golden (2023) as the highest-charting album by any K-pop solo artist. "Like Jennie" was a commercial success and became Jennie's third number-one song on South Korea's Circle Digital Chart. It debuted at number five on the Billboard Global 200 and number three on the Billboard Global Excl. US, becoming Jennie's fourth and fifth top-ten hit on each chart respectively. "Mantra", "Like Jennie", and "ExtraL" were certified gold by the RIAA, making Jennie the first K-pop solo artist with three and four RIAA certifications.

A music video for the album track "Handlebars" featuring Dua Lipa was released on March 10. It was subsequently sent to US contemporary hit radio the following day and Italian radio on March 14, serving as the album's fifth single. "Handlebars" charted simultaneously on the Billboard Hot 100 alongside "Like Jennie" and "ExtraL", making Jennie the first K-pop female soloist to have three songs on the chart in the same week. She also became the K-pop female soloist with the most entries on the chart, with six total including all five singles from Ruby. Jennie released a music video for the album track "Seoul City" on April 26, marking the seventh music video from the album. Jennie was noted for redefining K-pop album promotion by releasing videos for nearly half of the album's 15 tracks, a first among K-pop artists. In promotion of Ruby, Jennie embarked on a run of concerts titled the Ruby Experience starting on March 6. Originally announced as a three-show run in Los Angeles, New York, and Seoul, the mini-tour later scheduled additional shows in Los Angeles and Paris. It was praised by critics for its experimental and cinematic production. Jennie was honored with the Global Force Award at the 2025 Billboard Women in Music Awards, the first time a Korean soloist received an honor at the award ceremony. She performed songs from Ruby at Coachella in April 2025, becoming the first K-pop solo artist to perform at the festival's Outdoor Theatre.

Jennie during her headlining set at the Governors Ball Music Festival in 2026

On July 24, Jennie signed a co-management deal with ALTA Music Group alongside her own company Odd Atelier, becoming the first artist signed to the newly formed company's management division. She performed at the 2025 Melon Music Awards on December 20, where she won three awards for Record of the Year, Millions Top 10, and Top 10 Artist. Her daesang (grand prize) win for Record of the Year marked the first time a soloist won the category in Melon Music Award history. On January 10, 2026, Jennie performed at the 40th Golden Disc Awards, where she became the first artist to win the newly established Artist of the Year daesang. She also accepted the Global Impact with Prizm Award and Best Digital Song for "Like Jennie" and Blackpink's "Jump". At the 23rd Korean Music Awards, Jennie garnered Best K-pop Album for Ruby and Best K-pop Song for "Like Jennie".

In 2026, Jennie collaborated with Tame Impala on a remix to their song "Dracula". The remix was a commercial success and spawned a viral TikTok trend joined by numerous celebrities. As a result, "Dracula" surged in popularity and peaked at number two on the Billboard Global 200 and Global Excl. US, earning Tame Impala their first top 10 on both charts and Jennie's fifth on the former chart and sixth on the latter. The remix also peaked at number three on the Billboard Hot 100, tying her bandmate Rosé's "APT." (2024) as the highest-charting song by a female K-pop artist, and marking the first top-ten hit for both Tame Impala and Jennie. It eventually became the longest-charting song by a K-pop artist in the top 10 of the chart, surpassing BTS' "Butter". "Dracula" received nominations at the 69th Annual Grammy Awards for Record of the Year and Best Pop Duo/Group Performance.

On June 7, Jennie headlined the Governors Ball Music Festival, becoming the first K-pop solo artist to headline the festival. She headlined the Roskilde Festival on July 3 and the Open'er Festival on July 4, becoming the first K-pop soloist to headline two major European music festivals back-to-back, while also headlining the Mad Cool Festival on July 10. On July 24, Jennie released the single "Less Than a Lover". She headlined Lollapalooza on August 1, becoming the first female solo K-pop headliner, and the Summer Sonic Festival on August 14 and 16. On August 28, she released her digital EP Fallen Angel, which includes the lead single of the same name and previously released single "Less Than a Lover". On November 6, Jennie released "Someone to Hold" as the lead single from the soundtrack of the 2026 Netflix animated fantasy comedy film Steps. She also contributed the song "Power Trip" for Grand Theft Auto VI: The Album, the soundtrack album for the 2026 action-adventure game Grand Theft Auto VI.

== Other ventures ==
=== Philanthropy ===
Jennie has been part of the Cheongdam Woori Animal Hospital's "Protect Our Family" campaign since 2018, which helps to protect pets and rescue abandoned dogs. In November 2023, she attended the 18th Breast Cancer Awareness Campaign Charity Event, a charity gala to raise funds for cancer screening, surgery and treatment for low-income people. In May 2024, she donated ₩100 million (US$74,400) to the Korean branch of Habitat for Humanity in the name of Blink, Blackpink's fan club, to aid in the construction of an alternative school for the youth. Proceeds from her US shows for the Ruby Experience in March 2025 supported fire recovery efforts and local firefighters in Los Angeles, which was devastated by wildfires in January. The same month, she donated ₩100 million to the Hope Bridge National Disaster Relief Association to help with wildfire relief in Ulsan, North Gyeongsang Province, and South Gyeongsang Province. Her donation would be used for practical recovery activities such as emergency livelihood support, providing relief supplies, and operating temporary shelters for residents in the affected areas. In May 2025, Jennie donated ₩100 million to the Seoul National University College of Medicine Development Fund due to her interest in nurturing future doctors. The college planned to use the donation to strengthen its education and research environment and focus on nurturing talented individuals with social empathy. In February 2026, Jennie donated ₩100 million, including all proceeds from her photo exhibition J2NNI5 held in January as well as personal funds, to the Briquette Bank for the "Raise Korea's Temperature by 1 Degree" campaign. The donation provided for 12,000 coal briquettes to help vulnerable seniors heat their homes during the winter season.

== Artistry ==
When Jennie first began to rap, she studied the work of Black-American artists she admired and respected, such as Lauryn Hill and TLC. Jennie also cited Black-Caribbean artist Rihanna as her main musical influence and role model. While working on Blackpink's The Album, Jennie listened to artists such as Lana Del Rey, Billie Eilish, Harry Hudson, H.E.R. and Kacey Musgraves. Vocal coach Shin Yoo-mi, who worked with Blackpink for six years until their debut, trained Jennie for her solo debut. In an interview, Shin described Jennie as versatile, with talent for singing, rapping and songwriting.

== Media image ==
=== Endorsements ===
In 2019, Jennie became the face of Hera, a South Korean luxury beauty brand owned by Amore Pacific, choosing Jennie to represent their brand due to her "elegant and luxurious" image. Hera's first lip advertisement with Jennie, the Red Vibe lip series, saw an increase in sales by five times compared to Hera's previous lip product. Due to their growing popularity, they were dubbed "Jennie's lipsticks". In April 2021, Hera launched their Rouge Holic line on Amazon with Jennie serving as their global ambassador. In April 2022, Jennie promoted Hera's Silky Stay Foundation.

KT Corporation, one of South Korea's largest telephone companies, recruited Jennie as an endorsement model alongside Soojoo for the Samsung Galaxy S20 Aura Red and Blue, respectively, in February 2020. The product, named "Jennie Red", was launched exclusively for KT customers residing in South Korea. On June 11, 2020 Lotte Confectionery announced Jennie as their brand endorser for their latest snack product, Air Baked. They considered Jennie to be "trendy" within their targeted customer demographic, women in their 20s and 30s, for the product.

On February 2, 2021, Jennie was announced as the face of Chum Churum, a soju brand under Lotte Corporation. On February 10, Lotte Chilsung released Jennie's promotional material for the brand for the first time. On March 8, Jennie became the advertisement model of Kwangdong Vita500, a vitamin drink brand. On April 8, Dashing Diva, a global nail brand, introduced Jennie as their new brand model. On August 17, she became a model for South Korean bed and mattress brand Ace Bed. In August 2022, Jennie became the face of soju brand Lotte Soonhari. In September 2022, Jennie became a model for South Korean perfume brand Tamburins. In July 2025, she was named an honorary tour ambassador for Seoul. Jennie was announced as the global ambassador for Italian luxury sunglasses brand Ray Ban in April 2026.

=== Collaborations ===
On April 15, 2020, it was announced that Jennie had collaborated with Gentle Monster, a South Korean luxury eyewear brand, to create a collection called "Jentle Home", inspired by Jennie's childhood memories. Jennie designed the items herself, including glasses, sunglasses, eyewear chains, and more. In May 2020, Gentle Monster and Jennie opened a dollhouse-themed pop up store in Gangnam District, Seoul. On February 18, 2022, Gentle Monster announced the launch of the mobile game Jentle Garden, their second collaboration with Jennie, which released on February 22 in the Google Play Store and App Store. The game was launched to commemorate the next product collaboration, scheduled to be launched in mid-March.

On March 10, 2022, Jennie and Gentle Monster released their third collaboration, an eyewear collection called "Jentle Garden". The campaign photos were shot by French photographer Hugo Comte. Days later, Jennie and Gentle Monster opened a fantasy world-themed pop up store in Gangnam District, Seoul. The house at the pop up store was designed by Jennie. In April 2022, Jennie and Gentle Monster released a limited eyewear collection titled Lesyeuxdenini which were only available at Gentle Monster's Los Angeles flagship store. Jennie designed the collection's leather package and flower keyring. On October 12, 2022, it was announced that Jennie had begun a partnership with German auto company Porsche, and helped in the design process of a custom car made for herself, named Jennie Ruby Jane in the model of a Taycan 4S Cross Turismo. After headlining a Solo Buds ad campaign for Beats by Dre in 2024, Jennie collaborated with the brand to release the special edition Jennie Ruby Red Beats Solo 4 wireless headphones in September 2025. In the same month, she collaborated with American drinkware brand Stanley 1913 to release the limited edition Stanley 1913 x JENNIE collection in Midnight Ruby. In November, Jennie partnered with German confectionery brand Haribo to release limited edition Ruby Hearts gummies, available only in Target, as inspired by her first studio album Ruby.

In April 2026, Jennie collaborated with American beachwear brand Frankies Bikinis to launch a collection including both swimwear and everyday clothing.

=== Fashion ===
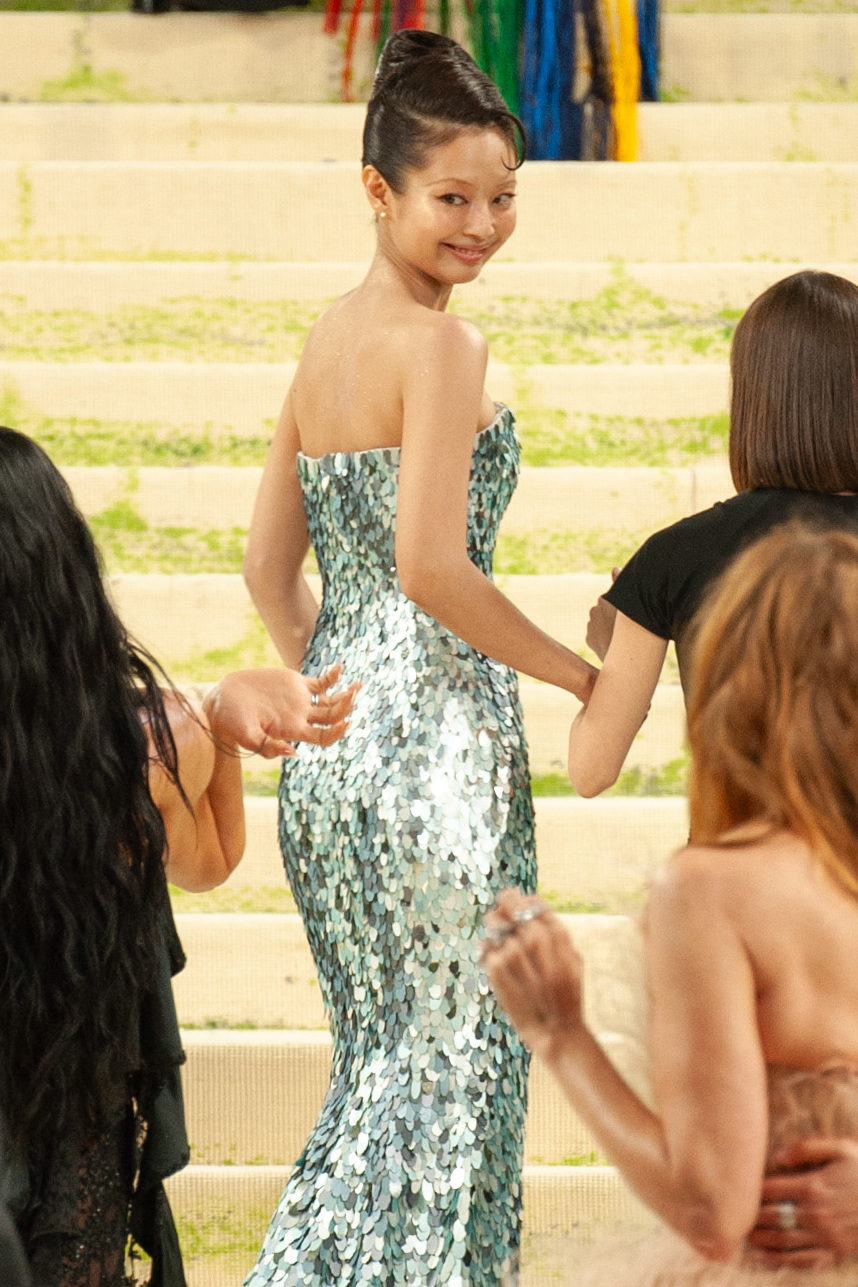
Jennie wearing a Chanel gown at the 2026 Met Gala

Jennie took an interest in fashion from a young age. Jennie told Elle Indonesia that Chanel was a part of her life from a young age and that she still remembered her first memory involving the fashion house: "I remember when I was little, I look through my mother's wardrobe, and search for whatever vintage Chanel I could find". For her solo debut, she was involved in planning and styling her own wardrobe, putting together more than 20 outfits for the music video of "Solo". Jennie recalled in an interview with Billboard that during the filming of the music video for the song, she considered the way her clothes would fit the song and made adjustments. She stated in an interview with Elle Korea that fashion has become a key aspect in her career as she tries to convey meaning through her music both aurally and visually.

Jennie was chosen as the new muse for Chanel Korea Beauty and shot her first pictorial for the brand with Harper's Bazaar Korea in January 2018. She became the ambassador of Chanel Korea in June. A spokesperson for Chanel Korea explained that Jennie's loyalty to the brand, as well as her trendy style, was in line with Chanel's image as they targeted young millennials in addition to their current consumers. Jennie attended the launch of Chanel's new fragrance, Les Eaux De Chanel, in Deauville, France, that same month. She met and interviewed Chanel's in-house perfume creator, Olivier Polge, and shot a pictorial for his new collection of fragrances with Cosmopolitan Korea.

In October, Jennie was named global ambassador for Chanel. She attended her first Chanel fashion show as a Korean representative during Paris Fashion Week. On September 23, 2021, Jennie became the face of Chanel's Coco Neige 2021-22 campaign with photos taken by Dutch photographers Inez and Vinoodh. In May 2023, Jennie made her Met Gala debut, dressed in the vintage Chanel's fall 1990 ready-to-wear collection dress. In January 2024, she starred in the Chanel Coco Crush ad campaign. In March 2025, Jennie became the face of the brand's Chanel 25 handbag campaign alongside English singer Dua Lipa.

On May 18, 2021, Jennie became the face of Calvin Klein's Spring 2021 collection, Drop 02, a collaboration between Calvin Klein and Heron Preston. Her campaign images were shot by photographer Kim Hee June and directed by Qiu Bohan. On September 9, 2021, Jennie became a model for Calvin Klein's Fall 2021 campaign, called The Language of Calvin Klein, as part of the brand's #MyCalvins digital campaign. Her photos were shot by Hong Jang Hyun. On February 16, 2022, Jennie became the face of Calvin Klein's Spring 2022 Campaign. In May 2023, Jennie partnered with Calvin Klein for its first capsule collection. In December 2023, Jennie starred in Jacquemus' "Guirlande" holiday campaign. On June 10, 2024, she made her debut as a runway model by closing Jacquemus' 15th-anniversary show in Capri, Italy. In March 2024, Jennie fronted Maison Kitsuné's Spring 2024 campaign, titled "Baby Fox".

In June 2024, Jennie was featured in the Adidas Originals by Edison Chen CLOT Gazelle campaign. In July 2025, she was featured in the Adidas Originals “Superstar: The Original” campaign.

Jennie served as one of the fashion editors for Vogue Korea's March 2021 issue. According to the magazine, she participated in photoshoots as a planner and helped decide the concept, hair and makeup drafts, and styling.

=== Persona ===
Jung Chul-min, producer of Village Survival, the Eight, described Jennie as "really funny": "Contrary to the charisma she shows on stage, she is a shy person who has girlish, baby-like charms. Jennie gets more comfortable with each episode, she brings out more fun and enjoys it even more". When asked by Elle Korea about being described as "icon" and "unique", Jennie responded that "it's really an honor to be an inspiration and iconic being for someone. When you express me with these words, I feel like [I need] to look nicer and better". Jennie describes herself as "quiet" and "shy", especially around strangers. In an interview with Harper's Bazaar, Jennie remarked, "My personality may be what people think about my personality. But rather than being a person that other people have branded me as, I want to be a good individual who thinks for herself".

== Impact ==
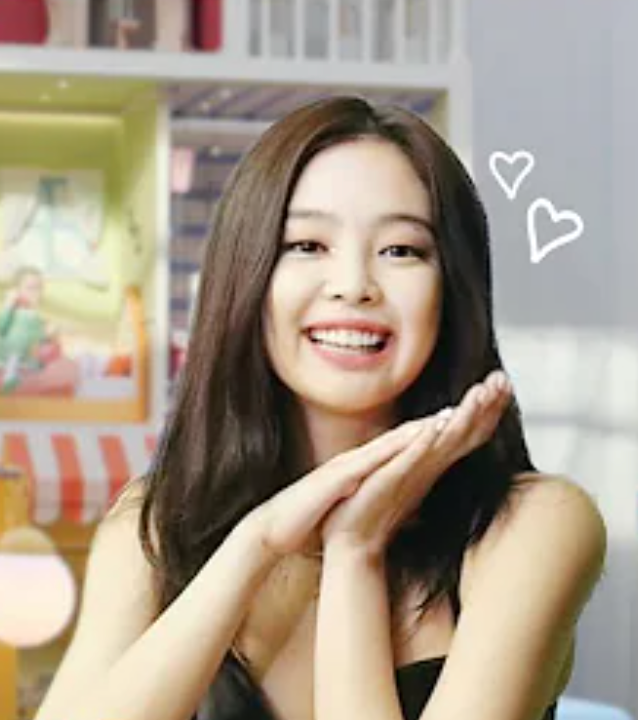
Jennie in a video for Marie Claire Korea in 2020

Jennie has been considered instrumental to Blackpink's fashion image, leading to her nicknames "Human Gucci" and "Human Chanel". Her style portfolio ranges from Gucci and Saint Laurent to niche labels such as Marine Serre and Richard Quinn. Jennie's sense of fashion earned her invitations to fashion events such as Saint Laurent's Summer 17 Collection Launch Party by Anthony Vaccarello, Chanel's Mademoiselle Privé exhibition, and Prada's Comics Collection Launch Party. Chanel chose her as House Ambassador after noting her sway with consumers. The hairpins Jennie wore in a five-by-five partition during her performances of her debut single "Solo" instantly trended in South Korea and were referred to as "Jennie's hairpins".

Jennie's first magazine cover and a solo pictorial were for Dazed Korea with Saint Laurent in April 2017. She was the first Korean celebrity to model for Boucheron Paris, a 160-year-old luxury jewelry brand; it was said that Jennie's "elegant" and "luxurious" atmosphere moved Boucheron to focus more on their image marketing. The pictorial, presented in the high-end membership magazine Heren in 2017, was described as "art that embodies light". Jennie has since appeared on the covers of fashion magazines including Dazed, Harper's Bazaar, Elle, Marie Claire, High Cut, Cosmopolitan, W, Vogue, Wonderland, and Billboard.

Jennie is known for her brand recognition and marketing power, having placed first on the Korean Business Research Institute's monthly "Individual Girl Group Members Brand Power Ranking" numerous times. In 2021, she became the first Korean to amass 50 million followers on Instagram. As of December 2023, she remains the most-followed Korean individual and the second most-followed K-pop idol behind bandmate Lisa, with over 82.5 million followers on the platform. Photos from her social media accounts have frequently headlined articles, and the items she features often become trends. In 2018, Jennie ranked second, receiving 12.2% of votes, in the Most Favorite Idols survey conducted annually by Gallup Korea that involved 1,501 Korean male and female respondents aged 13 to 29. Instagram named Jennie's account the "Most Loved Account of 2018" in South Korea based on the number of views and likes received by her Instagram stories and posts that year.

Forbes acknowledged that Jennie has been "gaining a new foothold in Korea's beauty trends" and cited it as one of the reasons why Blackpink topped Forbes Korea Power Celebrity in April 2019. She was the most-searched female K-pop idol of 2019 according to Google's mid-year chart. That year, Jennie was also ranked as the seventh most popular female K-pop idol in a survey of soldiers completing mandatory military service in South Korea. In Gallup Korea's music poll in 2019, Jennie was voted the eighth most popular idol in South Korea, ahead of her bandmates. Jennie's "Jentle Home" collection, launched in April 2020, sold out several successive restocks immediately. On December 2, 2020, Chinese singer and former Youth With You contestant Ye Ziming released a song titled "Jennie", which featured lyrics about his admiration of Jennie.

On January 16, 2021, her 25th birthday, Jennie started her official YouTube channel. It became the fastest channel to reach one million subscribers, taking less than seven hours. Within 24 hours, she accumulated over 1.75 million subscribers and became the second most subscribed YouTube user within the timeframe, following Brazilian singer Marília Mendonça.

Sales losses suffered by Chum Churum, a soju brand under Lotte Corporation, due to the impacts of the COVID-19 pandemic were reported to have recovered by 14-15% after they secured Jennie to promote their product. It was also reported that Ace Bed's stock price soared 28.14% after naming Jennie as their new brand model.

Former K-pop girl group After School member Jung Ah nicknamed her baby Jennie, calling it a "cute and pretty" name and citing her admiration of Jennie as an idol. In August 2021, Jennie was voted the sixth most well-rounded idol with talents in songwriting, dancing, and singing. She was the highest-ranking female idol on the list with 2,025 votes. In November 2021, Osen reported that Jennie was ranked sixth in celebrity endorsement earnings in 2021, with an estimated ₩5 billion, despite only appearing in five advertisements that year. On February 23, 2022, a day after the release of her Jentle Garden app, it was reported that it had ranked number one in the "popularity" category of the Korean App Store, surpassing TikTok. In March 2022, YG Family's video 'Fifteen Nights on a Business Trip 2' with Jennie as a special guest surpassed 10 million views on YouTube. The clothes she wore went viral, including search phrases on portal sites.

In June 2025, Vogue Korea reported that Jennie's capsule collection with Calvin Klein generated $8.6 million in Media Impact Value (MIV). (Note: Media Impact Value is a proprietary algorithm developed by Launchmetrics to measure the impact of placements and mentions across different voices in the Fashion, Luxury, and Cosmetics (FLC) industry.) This put her in the third place on the Calvin Klein ambassadors ranking, behind American actor Jeremy Allen White and BTS's Jung Kook. Jennie's appearance in Jacquemus's "Guirlande" holiday campaign garnered 4.2 million likes and a 5.12% engagement rate with a single post on the day of the campaign's release.

Various artists have cited Jennie as an influence and role model, such as Hot Issue's Dana, Woo!ah!'s Nana, Cignature's Belle, LinQ's Miyu Kaneko, Nmixx's Lily, Sullyoon and Jiwoo, Aespa's Ningning, Lightsum's Jian, former Madein's Gaeun, Fifty Fifty's Keena, Babymonster's Ahyeon, HITGS's Iyoo, Illit's Moka, and Rescene's Woni and Zena. Olympic athletes Hwang Sun-woo and Kang So-hwi are also fans of Jennie.

Jennie was listed in "The 100 Most Influential People of 2026" by Time magazine in the artist category, highlighting her growing cultural influence beyond music, spanning fashion, entertainment, and wider pop culture conversations. Jennie and her bandmates in Blackpink received the fourth-class Okgwan Order of Cultural Merit at the 2026 Korean Popular Culture and Arts Awards.

== Discography ==
- Ruby (2025)

== Filmography ==
=== Television ===
| Year | Title | Role | Notes | Ref. |
|---|---|---|---|---|
| 2018 | Village Survival, the Eight | Herself (cast member) | | |
| 2023 | The Idol | Dyanne | Credited as Jennie Ruby Jane | |
| 2024 | Apartment 404 | Herself (cast member) | | |
| 2024 | My Name Is Gabriel | Herself (cast member) | | |
| 2026 | The Secret Friends Club | Herself (cast member) | | |

=== Web shows ===
| Year | Title | Role | Notes | Ref. |
|---|---|---|---|---|
| 2018 | Jennie: Solo Diary | Herself | 6 episodes | |

=== Music video appearances ===
| Year | Title | Artist | Director | Length | Ref. |
|---|---|---|---|---|---|
| 2012 | "That XX" | G-Dragon | Han Sa-min | 3:34 | |
| 2022 | "Shinigami Eyes" | Grimes | BRTHR | 3:20 | |

== Concert tours ==
- The Ruby Experience (2025)

== See also ==
- List of artists who reached number one on the Billboard Adult Top 40
- List of artists who reached number one on the Hot Dance/Electronic Songs
- List of artists who reached number one on the UK Singles Downloads Chart
- List of artists who reached number one on the U.S. Pop Airplay chart
