= I Like the Way (EP) =

- Digital cover

EP by Kim Woojin
- Released: April 22, 2024
- Studios: Sound Pool (Seoul); Doobdoob (Seoul); Klang (Seoul)
- Genres: Pop; R&B; dance
- Length: 14:05
- Languages: Korean; English
- Labels: Kustomade; Stone; Genie

Kim Woojin chronology
The Moment: Bounce (2023)	I Like the Way (2024)

Singles from I Like the Way
- 1. "I Like the Way" Released: April 22, 2024

Music videos
- "I Like the Way" on YouTube "What U Say" on YouTube

I Like the Way (stylized in all caps) is the third EP by South Korean singer Kim Woojin, released on April 22, 2024 by Kustomade and distributed by Stone Music Entertainment and Genie Music. The EP consists of five tracks, including the lead single of the same name.

Commercially, the EP peaked at number seven on the Circle Album Chart, with the highest first-week sales of Kim's career. To promote the EP, Kim embarked on the I Like the Way Tour in June 2024.

== Background and release ==
Eight months prior to the release of I Like the Way, Kim released his second EP The Moment: Bounce under 10x Entertainment. On March 18, 2024, SM Entertainment announced that they had acquired 10x and were folding it into their Kreation Music Rights subsidiary under the name "Kustomade". One week later, the label indicated that Kim would release the agency's first new music in April. The EP's title and release date were officially announced on April 4, along with an image of Kim cutting his hair and a YouTube video on Kim's YouTube channel entitled "Rebirth: Kim Woojin", showing him smashing a statue and walking down a runway under spotlights. The video and imagery was said to symbolize a "fresh start" and be the singer's "declaration to break free from everything that has oppressed him and pave his path." I Like the Way was officially released on April 22, 2024, along with the lead single of the same name and its music video.

== Composition ==
I Like the Way is a pop EP with contemporary R&B, dance, and afrobeat influences. Kim participated in writing the lyrics for all songs except the third track, "Pretty Mess". The EP's first track and lead single, "I Like the Way", is a dance-pop song with strong bass guitar, with Ryan S. Jhun and Digital Farm Animals included among its contributors. "Pretty Mess" is a rhythmic R&B pop song, and "What U Say" is a pop song with afrobeat influences. The EP's fourth track, "Hold", is a pop ballad composed by Kim, alongside Kangta, a member of SM Entertainment's first boy band, H.O.T. The final track, "To. My Friend", is a pop-R&B song with prominent acoustic guitar. The EP's five tracks have a total length of 14 minutes 5 seconds.

== Promotion ==
To promote the EP, Kim performed on several South Korean music programs. Kim performed "I Like the Way" on Mnet's M Countdown on April 25, Arirang TV's Simply K-Pop on April 26, May 3, 10, and 17, SBS's Inkigayo on April 28, and May 5, MBC Plus's Show Champion on May 1, SBS M's The Show on May 7, and 14, KBS's Music Bank on May 10, and MBC's Show! Music Core on May 11.

Kim also performed "I Like the Way" on Dingo Music's YouTube channel and I Like the Way, Pretty Mess and What U Say for Fromm Studio's Origin series.

== Commercial performance ==
I Like the Way debuted on the Circle Album Chart issued April 27 at number seven, selling 35,742 copies in six days of tracking, becoming the best-selling first week of Kim's career. On Circle's monthly rankings chart, the album entered at number 30 for April 2024, Kim's highest position on the chart.

== Track listing ==
Credits adapted from the EP's liner notes and Naver Vibe.

I Like the Way track listing
No.	Title	Lyrics	Music	Arrangement	Length
1.	"I Like the Way"	Kim Woojin; Ayler; Ryan S. Jhun; Matt Zara; Ben Samara; Nicholas James Gale; David Charles Snyder; Rachel Kanner; Mustafa Omer; James Murray	Jhun; Zara; Samara; Gale; Snyder; Kanner; Omer; Murray	Jhun; Samara; Gale; Omer; Murray	2:52
2.	"Pretty Mess"	Saay; Kyle Lo; Jabel; Jword	Lo; Jabel; Jword	Lo	2:45
3.	"What U Say"	Kim; Shakka Philip; Joo Gang-hyun; Keymaker	Philip; Joo; Keymaker	Joo; Keymaker	2:34
4.	"Hold"	Kim; Kangta	Kangta; Eldon	Kangta; Eldon	2:47
5.	"To. My Friend"	Kim; Son Hee-seung; Alysa Ayaka Ichinose; William Segerdahl	Ichinose; Segerdahl	Ichinose	3:05
Total length:					14:05

== Credits and personnel ==
Credits adapted from the EP's liner notes and Naver Vibe.

Studio

- Doobdoob Studios – recording, digital editing (track 1, 3)
- Sound Pool Studios – recording, mixing (track 1, 2, 5), digital editing (track 1, 5)
- Klang Studio – recording (track 4) mixing (track 3, 4)
- Command K Studio – digital editing (track 2)
- SM Wavelet Studio – engineered for mix (track 1)
- SM Concert Hall Studio – mixing (track 1)
- 821 Sound Mastering – mastering (all tracks)

Personnel

- Kustomade – executive producer
- Lee Sung-soo – executive supervisor
- Kim Woojin – vocals, background vocals (all tracks), lyrics (track 1, 3, 4, 5)
- Ryan S. Jhun – lyrics, composition, arrangement (track 1)
- Ben Samara – lyrics, composition, arrangement (track 1)
- Nicholas James Gale – lyrics, composition, arrangement (track 1)
- Mustafa Omer – lyrics, composition, arrangement (track 1)
- James Murray – lyrics, composition, arrangement (track 1)
- Matt Zara – lyrics, composition (track 1)
- David Charles Snyder – lyrics, composition (track 1)
- Rachel Kanner – lyrics, composition (track 1)
- Ayler – Korean lyrics (track 1)
- Kyle Lo – lyrics, composition, arrangement, vocal direction (track 2)
- Jabel – lyrics, composition, vocal direction (track 2)
- Sword – lyrics, background vocals (track 2)
- Stay – Korean lyrics (track 2)
- Joo Gang-hyun – lyrics, composition, arrangement, background vocals, vocal direction (track 3)
- Shakka Philip – lyrics, composition, background vocals (track 3)
- Keymaker – lyrics, composition, arrangement (track 3)
- Eldon – lyrics, composition, arrangement, background vocals, vocal direction (track 4)
- Kangta – Korean lyrics, composition, arrangement, vocal direction (track 4)
- Son Hee-seung – Korean lyrics (track 5)
- William Segerdahl – lyrics, composition (track 5)
- Alysa Ayaka Ichinose – lyrics, composition, arrangement (track 5)
- D'tour – background vocals (track 1), vocal direction (track 1, 3)
- Petra – background vocals, vocal direction (track 1)
- Paul Kyte – vocal direction (track 5)
- Jeong Ho-jin – recording, digital editing (track 1)
- On Seong-eun – recording (track 1)
- Klozer – recording (track 2, 4), mixing, vocal direction (track 4)
- Jang Woo-young – recording (track 1, 3) digital editing (track 3)
- Nin Namkoong – mixing (track 1)
- Koo Jong-pil – mixing (track 3)
- Kwon Nam-woo – mastering (all tracks)

== Charts ==
=== Weekly charts ===
Weekly chart performance for I Like the Way
Chart (2024)	Peak position
South Korean Albums (Circle)	7

=== Monthly charts ===
Monthly chart performance for I Like the Way
Chart (2024)	Position
South Korean Albums (Circle)	30

== Release history ==
Release history for I Like the Way
Region	Date	Format	Label
South Korea	April 22, 2024	CD	Kustomade; Stone; Genie
Various	April 22, 2024	Digital download; streaming	Kustomade
