= The Moment: Bounce =

- Digital cover

EP by Kim Woojin
- Released: August 30, 2023
- Length: 19:42
- Languages: Korean; English
- Labels: 10x Entertainment; Stone; Genie

Kim Woojin chronology
Além do Guarda-Roupa (2023)	The Moment: Bounce (2023)	I Like the Way (2024)

Singles from The Moment: Bounce
- 1. "Say Something to Me" Released: August 4, 2023; 2. "On My Way" Released: August 30, 2023

Music videos
- "Say Something to Me" on YouTube "On My Way" on YouTube "Drive Away" on YouTube

The Moment: Bounce (stylized as The moment : 美成年, Bounce.) is the second EP by South Korean singer Kim Woojin, released on August 30, 2023 by 10x Entertainment and distributed by Stone Music Entertainment and Genie Music. The EP consists of six tracks, including the pre-released single "Say Something to Me" and lead single "On My Way".

Commercially, the EP peaked at number nineteen on the Circle Album Chart.

== Background and release ==
In 2021, Kim released his first EP, The Moment: A Minor. Throughout the following two years, he promoted the EP with the Still Dream World Tour and starred in HBO Max's Brazilian television series Além do Guarda-Roupa. Kim followed up The Moment: A Minor with The Moment: Bounce, which was released on August 30, 2023. The EP was described as an extension of his previous, and presents a brighter sound than its predecessor. Kim once again participated in writing lyrics for songs on the EP.

The Moment: Bounce would become Kim's final release under 10x Entertainment; the label was acquired by SM Entertainment in March 2024 and folded into the company's Kreation Music Rights subsidiary. Kim's future releases, starting with his subsequent EP I Like the Way, would be released under that label.

== Promotion ==
To promote the EP, Kim performed on several South Korean music programs. Kim performed "On My Way" on Mnet's M Countdown on August 31, KBS's Music Bank on September 1, SBS M's The Show on September 5 and 12, Arirang TV's Simply K-Pop on September 8 and 15, and MBC Plus's Show Champion on September 13.

To further promote the EP, Kim also appeared on MBC's It's Live and SBS Power FM's Cultwo Show.

== Commercial performance ==
The Moment: Bounce debuted on the Circle Album Chart issued September 2 at number nineteen, selling 4,681 copies in less than three days of tracking. The following week, the EP fell to number 82, selling an additional 1,160 units.

== Track listing ==
Credits adapted from the EP's liner notes and Naver Vibe.

The Moment: Bounce track listing
No.	Title	Lyrics	Music	Arrangement	Length
1.	"On My Way" (어른아이; Eoreunai [lit. "Adult Child"])	Znee (153/Joombas)	Phil Schwan; Azodi; Avenue 52 (153/Joombas); Sqvare	Schwan; Azodi	3:10
2.	"Song of Icarus"	Kim Woojin; Znee	Alysa (153/Joombas); William Segerdahl; Matilda Thompson; Haris Alagic	Alysa	3:23
3.	"Telepathy"	Kim Woojin; Chaeri (153/Joombas); Nadoyeon (153/Joombas); Znee	Erik Lidbom	Lidbom	3:04
4.	"Drive Away"	Znee	Nils Rulewski Stenberg; Jimmy Claeson	Stenberg	3:07
5.	"Tryin'"	Kim Woojin; GDLO (MonoTree); Ryan S. Jhun; Jeppe London Bilsby; Lauritz Emil Christiansen	Jhun; Stefan Hjort; Bilsby; Christiansen	Jhun; Bilsby; Christiansen	3:08
6.	"Say Something to Me"	Lee Ju-hyung (MonoTree); Kim Hae-ron	Lee; Kim Hae-ron	Lee	3:47
Total length:					19:42

== Charts ==
=== Weekly charts ===
Weekly chart performance for The Moment: Bounce
Chart (2024)	Peak position
South Korean Albums (Circle)	19

== Release history ==
Release history for The Moment: Bounce
Region	Date	Format	Label
South Korea	August 30, 2023	CD	10x; Stone; Genie
Various	August 30, 2023	Digital download; streaming	10x
