= List of Kim Woojin concert tours =

Kim Woojin concert tours
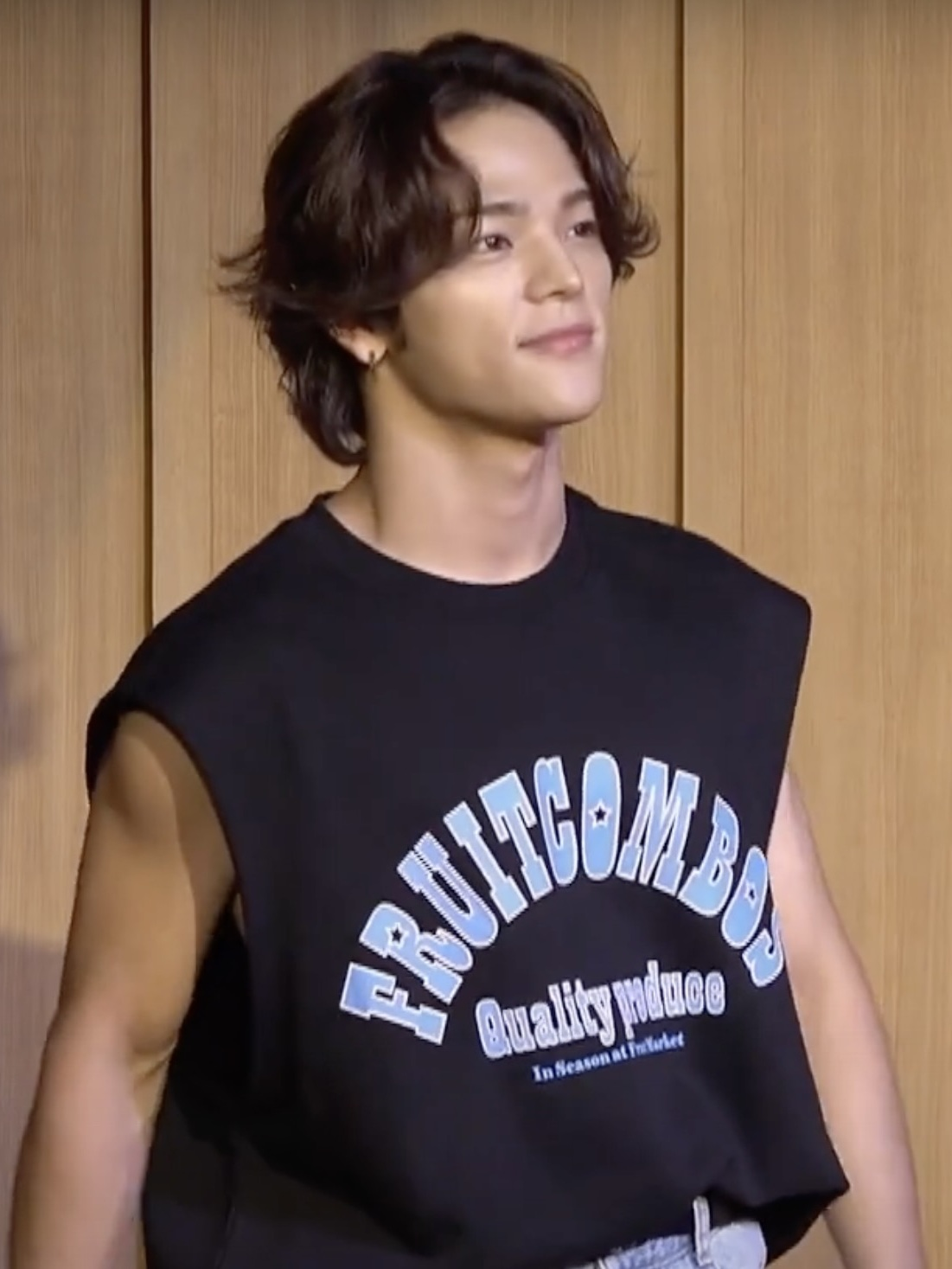
- Kim in 2023
- Concert tours: 3

South Korean singer Kim Woojin made his solo debut in 2021, and has embarked on three concert tours in support of each of his EPs. Over the course of his solo tours, Kim has performed 42 concerts in 21 countries across four continents.

Kim is a former member of South Korean boy band Stray Kids. As a member of Stray Kids, Kim participated in the Unveil Tour "I Am…" in 2019 and several one-off concerts and performances.

== Concert tours ==
Title	Dates	Associated album(s)	Continent(s)	Shows
Still Dream World Tour	July 17, 2022 – April 3, 2023	The Moment: A Minor	Europe; South America; North America; Asia	33
The Moment Tour	October 23, 2023 – October 29, 2023	The Moment: Bounce	Asia	4
I Like the Way Tour	June 8, 2024 – September 17, 2024	I Like the Way	Europe; Asia	5

== Still Dream World Tour ==
Still Dream World Tour
- Tour by Kim Woojin
- Promotional image
- Location: Europe; Latin America; North America; Asia
- Associated album: The Moment: A Minor
- Start date: July 17, 2022
- End date: April 3, 2023
- Legs: 4
- No. of shows: 33

In support of his debut EP, The Moment: A Minor, Kim embarked on the Still Dream World Tour. After being delayed due to the COVID-19 pandemic, the details of the tour's first shows were announced on June 2, with the tour kicking off in Milan on July 19 and continuing throughout Europe. Shows for the Latin American leg of the tour were announced on July 9, followed by US dates on September 11, and finally the Asian leg on February 23.

Over the length of the tour, Kim performed 33 shows in 19 countries.

=== Setlist ===
This set list is representative of the shows in Atlanta on November 8, 2022. It is not intended to represent all shows.

1. Ready Now
2. My Growing Pains
3. Falling
4. Sugar
5. If I Can't Have You
6. In My Space
7. Euphoria
8. Before You Go
9. Castle on the Hill
10. Rock with You
11. Hot
12. Still Dream
13. Because It's You
14. Purple Sky

=== Tour dates ===
List of tour dates, showing location and venue
Date	City	Country	Venue	Ref.
European leg
July 17, 2022	Milan	Italy	Legend Club	
July 18, 2022	Zurich	Switzerland	Moods	
July 19, 2022	Munich	Germany	Backstage Halle	
July 21, 2022	Prague	Czech Republic	Futurum Music Bar	
July 22, 2022	Berlin	Germany	Kesselhaus	
July 24, 2022	Frankfurt	Germany	Das Bett	
July 27, 2022	Cologne	Germany	Club Volta	
July 29, 2022	Amsterdam	Netherlands	Q Factory	
July 31, 2022	Paris	France	La Bellevilloise	
August 2, 2022	Manchester	England	Manchester Academy	
August 3, 2022	London	England	O2 Academy Islington	
August 4, 2022	Birmingham	England	The Asylum	
August 6, 2022	Madrid	Spain	Independance Club	
August 7, 2022	Barcelona	Spain	La Nau	
Latin American leg
September 4, 2022	Monterrey	Mexico	Foro Didi	
September 7, 2022	Mexico City	Mexico	Teatro Centenario Coyoacán	
September 9, 2022	Santiago	Chile	Teatro Coliseo	
September 11, 2022	São Paulo	Brazil	Carioca Club	
September 15, 2022	Brasília	Brazil	Teatro la Salle	
September 16, 2022	Goiânia	Brazil	Teatro Madre Esperança Garrido	
September 18, 2022	Rio de Janeiro	Brazil	Sacadura 154	
North American leg
November 3, 2022	Jersey City	United States	White Eagle Hall	
November 6, 2022	Chicago	United States	Avondale Music Hall	
November 8, 2022	Atlanta	United States	The Loft @ Center Stage	
November 10, 2022	Dallas	United States	Viva's Lounge	
November 12, 2022	San Francisco	United States	Marines' Memorial Theatre	
November 13, 2022	Los Angeles	United States	Teragram Ballroom	
Asia leg
March 23, 2023	Manila	Philippines	New Frontier Theater	
March 25, 2023	Singapore		Esplanade Annexe Studio	
March 26, 2023	Bangkok	Thailand	Ultra Arena Show DC	
March 29, 2023	Hong Kong		Music Zone @ E-Max	
April 1, 2023	Taipei	Taiwan	Nuzone	
April 3, 2023	Tokyo	Japan	Moon Romantic	

== The Moment Tour ==
The Moment Tour
- Tour by Kim Woojin
- Promotional image
- Location: India; Europe (cancelled)
- Associated album: The Moment: Bounce
- Start date: October 23, 2023
- End date: October 29, 2023
- Legs: 1 (1 cancelled)
- No. of shows: 4 (5 cancelled)

In support of his second EP, The Moment: Bounce, Kim embarked on his first tour of India in October 2023, entitled The Moment Tour. In early December, a tour of Europe beginning January 2024 was announced, but it was cancelled shortly after due to "unforeseen circumstances".

=== Tour dates ===
List of tour dates, showing location and venue
Date	City	Country	Venue	Ref.
October 23, 2023	New Delhi	India	JLN Stadium	
October 26, 2023	Dimapur	India	IMC Hall	
October 28, 2023	Bangalore	India	Jayamahal Palace	
October 29, 2023	Mumbai	India	Dublin Square	

==== Cancelled shows ====
List of cancelled tour dates, showing location, venue and reason
Date	City	Country	Venue	Reason
January 17, 2024	Paris	France	La Bellevilloise	Unforeseen circumstances
January 19, 2024	Warsaw	Poland	Hybrydy	Unforeseen circumstances
January 21, 2024	Berlin	Germany	Columbia Theatre	Unforeseen circumstances
January 23, 2024	London	England	O2 Academy Islington	Unforeseen circumstances
January 25, 2024	Madrid	Spain	Changó Club	Unforeseen circumstances

== I Like the Way Tour ==
I Like the Way Tour
- Tour by Kim Woojin
- Promotional image
- Location: Japan; Russia; Mexico
- Associated album: I Like the Way
- Start date: June 8, 2024
- End date: September 17, 2024
- Legs: 3
- No. of shows: 5

Kim embarked on the I Like the Way Tour in support of the EP of the same name in August 2024. The tour visited cities in Japan, Russia, and Mexico, returning to that country for the first time since the Still Dream World Tour in 2022. The Japanese dates were announced on May 11, followed by the Mexican leg on June 18, while Russia dates were announced on July 4. In Latin American shows, Kim performed songs from throughout his discography, including songs from his EPs and King the Land OST song "Dive". He also sang covers of "Ghost" by Justin Bieber and "Before You Go" by Lewis Capaldi.

=== Setlist ===
This set list is representative of the shows in Japan. It is not intended to represent all shows.

1. Song of Icarus
2. My Growing Pains
3. Pretty Mess
4. Say Something to Me
5. On My Way
6. In My Space
7. Drive Away
8. Hold
9. Ready Now
10. Telepathy
11. Dive
12. Betelgeuse
13. What U Say
14. Tryin'
15. To. My Friend
16. Purple Sky
17. I Like the Way
18. Still Dream

=== Tour dates ===
List of tour dates, showing location and venue
Date	City	Country	Venue	Ref.
June 8, 2024	Tokyo	Japan	Yokohama Bay Hall	
August 2, 2024	St. Petersburg	Russia	A2 Club	
August 3, 2024	Moscow	Russia	Atmosphere Space	
September 14, 2024	Mexico City	Mexico	Foro Indie Rocks	
September 17, 2024	Monterrey	Mexico	Foro Tims	
