= Xu Guanghan (disambiguation) =

Xu Guanghan, or Greg Hsu (許光漢; born 1990), is a Taiwanese actor and singer.

Xu Guanghan may also refer to:

- Greg Han (album) (許光漢), album by Taiwanese singer Greg Hau
- Xu Guanghan (許廣漢; 102–61 BC), Empress Xu Pingjun’s father

== See also ==
- Xu (disambiguation)
- 光漢 (disambiguation)
