= Kim Woojin =

South Korean singer (born 1997)

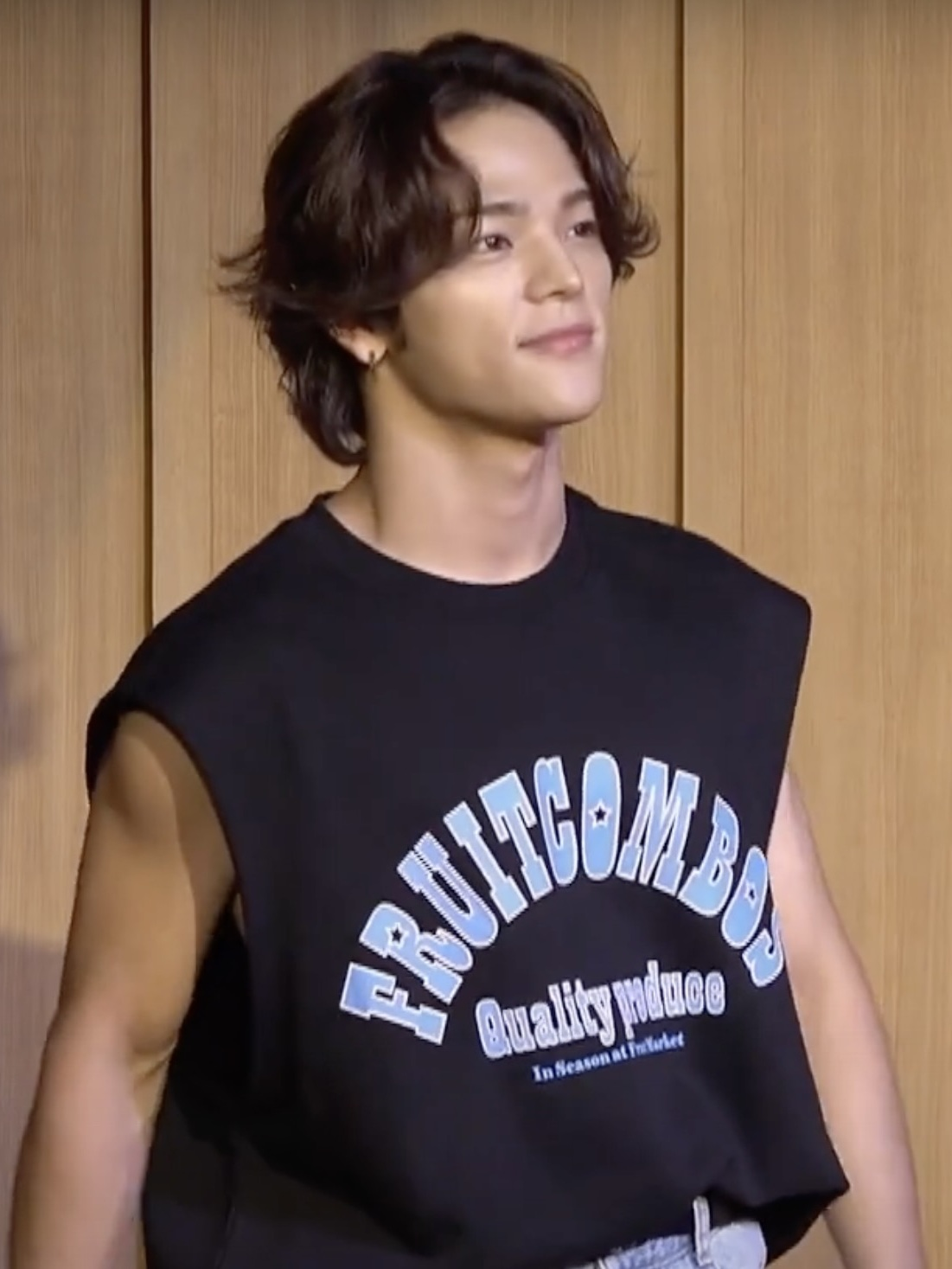
- Kim in 2023
- Born: April 8, 1997 (age 29); Bucheon, South Korea
- Education: School of Performing Arts Seoul
- Occupations: Singer; actor
- Musical career
- Genre: K-pop
- Instrument: Vocals
- Years active: 2017–present
- Labels: JYP; 10x; Kustomade
- Formerly of: Stray Kids
- Website: kimwoojin.net

Korean name
- Hangul: 김우진
- RR: Gim Ujin
- MR: Kim Ujin

Kim Woojin (Korean: 김우진; born April 8, 1997) is a South Korean singer and actor. He is a former member of the boy group Stray Kids, formed by JYP Entertainment in 2017. After leaving the group in late 2019, Kim debuted as a soloist in 2021 with the release of his first extended play (EP) The Moment: A Minor. Kim has since released two additional EPs.

Outside of music, Kim has ventured into acting, most notably with a starring role in HBO Max's Brazilian TV series Além do Guarda-Roupa (English: My Magic Closet). Originally signed to 10x Entertainment for solo activities, Kim has been under contract to Kustomade since the label's acquisition by SM Entertainment in 2024.

== Early life ==
Kim Woojin was born on April 8, 1997, in Bucheon, South Korea. He graduated from the School of Performing Arts Seoul. He was a trainee under SM Entertainment for one year, where he practiced with fellow apprentices that would go on to debut as part of NCT. On October 11, 2017, Kim was unveiled as a JYP Entertainment trainee.

== Career ==
=== 2017–2019: Stray Kids ===
In 2017, Kim competed in Mnet's reality survival show Stray Kids to become a member of the record label's forthcoming boy group of the same name. In midst of the competition, the group made the single "Hellevator" available via digital music stores on November 1. The nine-member lineup was confirmed in the final episode of the reality show and Stray Kids released their pre-debut EP Mixtape and lead single "Beware" on January 8, 2018.

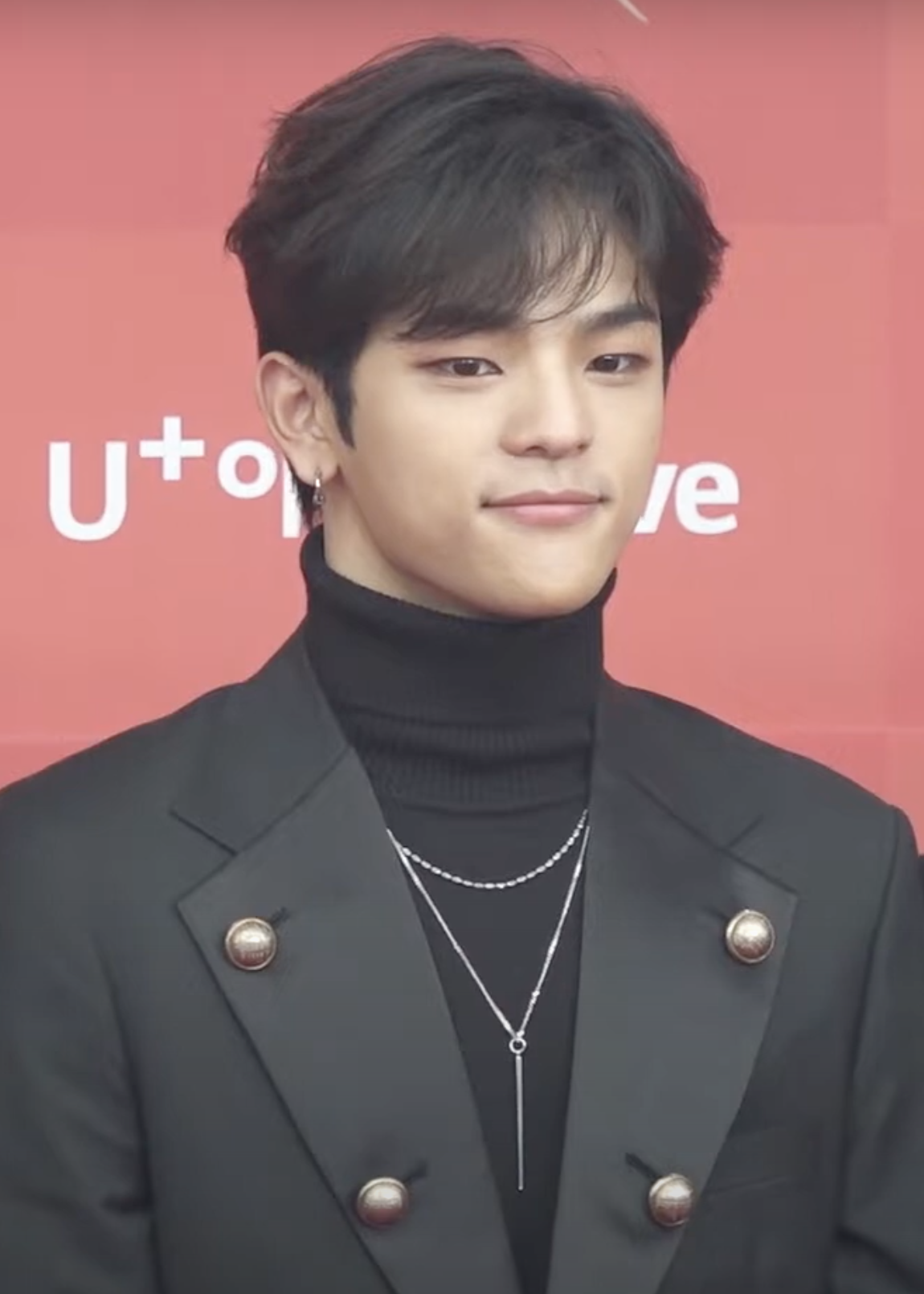
Kim with Stray Kids at the 2019 Golden Disc Awards

Kim officially debuted with Stray Kids on March 25, 2018 with a debut showcase performance entitled Unveil (Op. 01: I Am Not), at Jangchung Arena. On the next day, Stray Kids released an EP titled I Am Not and the lead single "District 9" which they showcased during the debut showcase. In this album, he also wrote the lyrics of song "Mixtape #1". (Note: Later in 2019, "Mixtape #1" also included in the EP Clé 2: Yellow Wood.)

On October 28, 2019, Kim left Stray Kids, with JYP Entertainment citing personal circumstances as the reason for his departure from the band. At the same time, JYP announced that their exclusive contract with Kim had been terminated. During his time as a member of Stray Kids, the group released six EPs, all of which were certified platinum by the Korea Music Content Association.

=== 2020–2023: Solo releases and acting debut ===
In January 2020, Kim posted to a newly created Instagram account with the phrase "Kim Woojin restart". He held a fan meeting in May and signed with the newly formed 10x Entertainment in August as the first artist on the label's roster. Ahead of his solo debut, Kim issued the pre-debut digital single "Still Dream" on July 8, 2021. His debut EP, The Moment: A Minor, and its lead single "Ready Now", were released on August 8. The EP peaked at number-seven on the Gaon Album Chart. That November, he provided the song "Because It's You" to the soundtrack of SBS TV drama Let Me Be Your Knight. In December, Kim starred in the web film 3.5th Period as the "sweet, handsome guy" Lee Han-ik. In addition to his acting role, Kim contributed the track "Timeless" to the film's official soundtrack.

After a delay due to the COVID-19 pandemic, Kim embarked on his first concert tour, the Still Dream World Tour, in 2022. The tour supported The Moment: A Minor and saw Kim visit nineteen countries and perform 33 shows across Europe, Latin America, North America, and Asia after beginning in July.

News of Kim's acting debut came in April when it was announced that he was cast as the lead role in HBO Max's then-upcoming Brazilian romantic fantasy series Além do Guarda-Roupa (English: My Magic Closet). With this role, he became the first South Korean actor to be cast in an HBO Max series. Kim portrayed Kyung-min, a member of fictional K-pop boy group "ACT", and contributed three songs for the soundtrack. The series filmed throughout 2022, and began airing in July 2023. Kim's next soundtrack contribution, a song entitled "In the End", was released in December 2022 as part of the original soundtrack of JTBC drama Reborn Rich. In July 2023, Kim once again contributed to another JTBC drama with song "Dive" for the original soundtrack of King the Land.

The Moment: Bounce, Kim's second EP, was released on August 30, 2023, along with its lead single "On My Way". The EP was described as an extension of his previous EP, The Moment: A Minor, and presented a brighter sound than its predecessor. The EP peaked at number 19 on the Circle Album Chart, and Kim supported it with The Moment Tour, his first tour in India.

Kim made his stage debut in late 2023, starring in the dual-role of twin brothers Adam and Eric Anderson in the musical Sherlock Holmes: The Secret of the Anderson Family. The play ran from September to November 2023.

=== 2024–present: Agency change and continued releases ===
On March 18, 2024, SM Entertainment announced that they had acquired Kim's agency, 10x Entertainment, and were folding it into their Kreation Music Rights subsidiary under a new name, Kustomade. One week later, the label indicated that Kim would release the agency's first new music in April. Kim's third EP, I Like the Way, was released on April 22, along with the lead single of the same name. The imagery related to the EP was said to symbolize a "fresh start" and be the singer's "declaration to break free from everything that has oppressed him and pave his path". The EP peaked at number-seven on the Circle Album Chart, and was the largest first week sales of Kim's career. To promote the EP, Kim embarked on the I Like the Way Tour in June 2024.

Kim began 2025 with the release of a new single, "5AM", on January 17. The mid-tempo, guitar-driven love song was released as a gift to fans three days prior to his mandatory military service enlistment.

== Personal life ==
=== Military service ===
Kim enlisted in the Republic of Korea Army on January 20, 2025, to carry out his mandatory military service. After receiving military recruit training, he will fulfill his military service as a member of the army band.

=== False allegations ===
In September 2020, Kim was accused of sexual harassment by unidentified women on the social media platform Twitter. One accuser alleged that, in spite of refusing his approach, Kim had attempted to touch her and her friend. Kim denied the allegations, stating that he "never even met that person" and had "never been to the places that they've mentioned". He filed a suit with the Seoul Metropolitan Police Agency against the individuals for defamation.

The police investigation found the allegations to be completely fabricated, made up by an apparent anti-fan. In addition, the police probe found that both people involved in disseminating the allegations were Brazilian nationals who had never been to South Korea or met Kim. In July 2021, 10x Entertainment published a documentary entitled Finger Killer, which examined the false accusations of sexual harassment made against Kim.

== Discography ==
=== Extended plays ===
Title	Details	Peak chart positions	Sales
Title	Details	KOR	Sales
The Moment: A Minor	Released: August 5, 2021; Label: 10x Entertainment; Formats: CD, digital download, streaming	7	KOR: 15,448
The Moment: Bounce	Released: August 30, 2023; Label: 10x Entertainment; Formats: CD, digital download, streaming	19	KOR: 5,841
I Like the Way	Released: April 22, 2024; Label: Kustomade; Formats: CD, digital download, streaming	7	KOR: 35,742

=== Singles ===
Title	Year	Album
"Still Dream"	2021	The Moment: A Minor
"Ready Now"	2021	The Moment: A Minor
"Say Something to Me"	2023	The Moment: Bounce
"On My Way"	2023	The Moment: Bounce
"I Like the Way"	2024	I Like the Way
"5AM"	2025	Non-album single

=== Soundtrack EPs ===
Title	Details
Além do Guarda-Roupa (Trilha Sonora da Série Original HBO Max) (English: My Magic Closet (HBO Max Original Series Soundtrack)) (with Jinkwon, Lee Min-wook, and Yoon Jae-chan)	Released: August 10, 2023; Label: WaterTower; Formats: digital download, streaming

=== Soundtrack appearances ===
Title	Year	Release
"Because It's You" (너니까)	2021	Let Me Be Your Knight OST
"Timeless"	2021	3.5th Period OST
"In the End"	2022	Reborn Rich OST Part 5
"Dive"	2023	King the Land OST Part 4
"Vroom" (with Jinkwon, Lee Min-wook, Yoon Jae-chan)	2023	Além do Guarda-Roupa OST
"Worlds Apart" (with Jinkwon, Lee Min-wook, Yoon Jae-chan)	2023	Além do Guarda-Roupa OST
"Time Bomb" (with Jinkwon, Lee Min-wook, Yoon Jae-chan)	2023	Além do Guarda-Roupa OST

=== Songwriting credits ===
All song credits are adapted from the Korea Music Copyright Association's database unless stated otherwise.

List of songs, showing year released, artist name, and name of the album
Title	Year	Artist	Album	Lyricist	Composer
"School Life"	2018	Stray Kids	Mixtape	Yes	Yes
"Who"	2018	Stray Kids	I Am Who	Yes	Yes
"Mixtape #1"	2019	Stray Kids	Clé 2: Yellow Wood	Yes	Yes
"Mixtape #2"	2019	Stray Kids	Clé 2: Yellow Wood	Yes	Yes
"Mixtape #3"	2019	Stray Kids	Clé 2: Yellow Wood	Yes	Yes
"Mixtape #4"	2019	Stray Kids	Clé 2: Yellow Wood	Yes	Yes
"In My Space"	2021	Kim Woojin	The Moment: A Minor	Yes	Yes
"Intro: Alea Iacta Est."	2021	Kim Woojin	The Moment: A Minor	Yes	No
"My Growing Pains"	2021	Kim Woojin	The Moment: A Minor	Yes	No
"Purple Sky"	2021	Kim Woojin	The Moment: A Minor	Yes	No
"Ready Now"	2021	Kim Woojin	The Moment: A Minor	Yes	No
"Still Dream"	2021	Kim Woojin	The Moment: A Minor	Yes	No
"Song of Icarus"	2023	Kim Woojin	The Moment: Bounce	Yes	No
"Telepathy"	2023	Kim Woojin	The Moment: Bounce	Yes	No
"Tryin"	2023	Kim Woojin	The Moment: Bounce	Yes	No
"Camellia"	2023	Kim Woojin	Non-album single (Note: Released exclusively onto YouTube)	Yes	Yes
"Hold"	2024	Kim Woojin	I Like the Way	Yes	No
"I Like the Way"	2024	Kim Woojin	I Like the Way	Yes	No
"To. My Friend"	2024	Kim Woojin	I Like the Way	Yes	No
"What U Say"	2024	Kim Woojin	I Like the Way	Yes	No

== Filmography ==
=== Television ===
Year	Title	Role	Ref.
2017	Stray Kids	Contestant	
2023	Além do Guarda-Roupa	Kyung-min	

=== Film ===
Year	Title	Role	Notes	Ref.
2021	Finger Killer	Himself	Documentary	
2021	3.5th Period	Lee Han-ik	Web film	

== Theater ==
Theater play performances of Kim Woojin
Year	Title	Role	Venue	Date	Ref.
2023	Sherlock Holmes: The Secret of the Anderson Family (셜록홈즈: 앤더슨가의 비밀)	Adam Anderson/Eric Anderson	Yonkang Hall at Doosan Art Center	September 14 to November 12	

== Concerts and tours ==
- Still Dream World Tour (2022–2023)
- The Moment Tour (2023)
- I Like The Way Tour (2024)

== Awards and nominations ==
Name of the award ceremony, year presented, category, nominee of the award, and the result of the nomination
Award ceremony	Year	Category	Nominee / Work	Result	Ref.
Asia Top Awards	2023	Best Artist	Kim Woojin	Won	
