= Lee Soo-man =

South Korean business executive and record producer (born 1952)

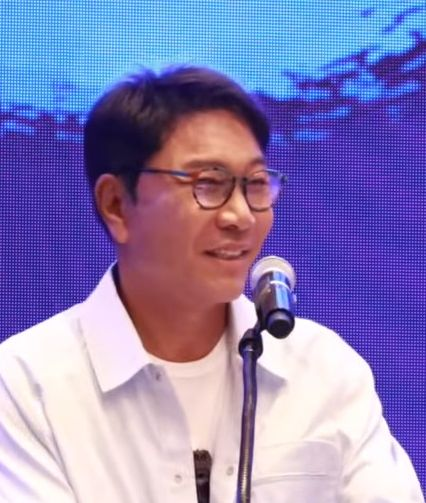
- Lee in 2024
- Born: 18 June 1952 (age 74); Jeonju, Jeolla Province, South Korea
- Education: Seoul National University (B.Eng.); California State University, Northridge (MS)
- Occupations: Business executive; record producer
- Known for: Founder of SM Entertainment; Founder and CEO of A2O Entertainment
- Spouse: Kim Eun-jin (formerly known as Kim Ji Hye) (m. 1984; died 2014)
- Children: 2
- Relatives: Lee Sung-soo (nephew); Sunny (niece)
- Awards: Eungwan Order of Cultural Merit (2011)

Korean name
- Hangul: 이수만
- Hanja: 李秀滿
- RR: I Suman
- MR: I Suman

Lee Soo-man (Korean: 이수만, born 18 June 1952) is a South Korean business executive and record producer who is best known for being the founder of SM Entertainment, a multinational entertainment company based in Seoul. He has also been referred to as the "president of culture", as one of the pioneers of the Korean Wave. Lee debuted as a singer in 1971 while he was a student at Seoul National University. In 1989, he founded SM Entertainment, which has since become one of the largest entertainment companies in the country.

== Biography ==
=== 1952–1980: Early years and singing career ===
Lee was born in Jeonju, South Korea, on 18 June 1952, and attended Seoul National University on and off between 1971 and 1979. Lee debuted as a member of the band April and May (사월과 오월, alternatively 4월과 5월) in 1972 (he had joined the band in 1971), but he later departed from it for health reasons. He gained spotlight for his "good boy" image, supported by the fact that he was one of the few people who were not involved in the weed scandal among Korean celebrities in 1975, and his high academic credentials in Seoul National University. He became known for hit songs such as "행복 (Happiness)", released in 1978, and "한송이 꿈 (A Piece of Dream)" released in 1976. In 1977, he was a member of the Korean indie band Sand Pebbles. In addition to his career as a musician and his studies in university, he worked as a radio DJ and TV host during this time. Lee Soo-man was also known for his trio with singers Lee Moon-sae and Yoo Yeol called Masamtrio (馬三트리오), named as such because of their appearances that resemble that of a long face of a horse. In 1980, he formed the band 이수만과 365일 (Lee Soo-man and The 365 Days). However, media censorship policies under the Chun Doo-hwan government discouraged him from a career in the Korean music industry.

=== 1980–1985: Studies in the United States ===
In the early 1980s, Lee decided to leave the entertainment world in order to pursue a career in computer engineering. He went abroad to work on a master's degree at California State University, Northridge, where he witnessed the rise of "superstars of the MTV generation" such as Michael Jackson. Inspired by the heyday of MTV in the United States, Lee set his sights on laying the foundation for the modern Korean pop music industry. In 1985, he returned to Korea "with a vision of what the Korean music industry could be."

=== 1985–2021: Founding SM Entertainment ===
Following his return to Korea, Lee ventured back into the entertainment world by working as a DJ and presenter. In 1989, after four years of saving money and gaining experience in the industry, he established an entertainment company called SM Studio (named after his initials) in the Apgujeong neighborhood of Seoul, and signed singer Hyun Jin-young. During the 1990s, SM Studio developed an in-house system that looked after all aspects of its artists' careers. Lee's approach was targeted at teenage audiences, and took a holistic view of the qualities needed to become a successful entertainer. The company was renamed SM Entertainment in 1995. In 1997, he founded the music production company Like Planning.

In February 2010, Lee resigned from his position as a member of SM's board of directors, but maintained a role in the company's "management and artist development" divisions. He continued to exert influence over SM through his production company, Like Planning, taking 6% of their revenue as a consultancy fee for his involvement in the music production process. He remained the biggest shareholder, controlling the company's management rights. He founded the music publishing company Culture Technology Group Asia in May 2015 and drone company LeePollux in February 2019.

In 2019, KB Asset Management, SM's third-largest shareholder, sent an open letter to the company complaining that Like Planning was taking 46% of SM's operating profit each year. They demanded a merger between Like Planning and SM, which the company rejected. On 23 January 2020, Lee Soo-man was listed by Billboard as one of the world's influential music industry leaders. He worked on South Korean girl group Loona's 2020 EP [#], which was his first ever project away from his namesake SM Entertainment.

=== 2022–present: Departure from SM Entertainment ===
In October 2022, SM announced that they would terminate their production contract with Lee's Like Planning by the end of the year. On 3 February 2023, SM said that they would restructure the company without the help of Lee, adopting a multi-production center system to replace his role as chief producer. Kakao purchased a 9.05% stake in SM, making them the second-largest shareholder, and signed a business agreement with SM to fund their plans. Lee, objecting to this, filed an injunction against the issuance of new shares and convertible bonds, which was upheld by the court. He sold his stake in SM to Hybe Corporation, making them the biggest shareholder. Hybe announced their intention to acquire the company with Lee's support. This sparked a battle for SM's management rights, putting Lee and Hybe against the SM executives and Kakao.

Lee Sung-soo, SM's co-CEO and Lee's nephew by marriage, uploaded a video to YouTube in which he levelled a series of accusations at Lee. In the video, he claimed that Lee had founded a company called CT Planning Limited in Hong Kong in 2019 to evade taxes, through which he was taking 6% of earnings from artists' overseas activities. The company had been established using SM's assets but was owned solely by Lee, and was the foreign equivalent of Like Planning. He also said that Lee wanted to force artists to publicly declare his importance to the company and attempted to insert environmental references into songs to promote his business interests. The National Tax Service said they would investigate the claims of tax evasion. Lacking the funds of their competitor, Hybe eventually withdrew from the takeover battle, enabling Kakao to become the largest shareholder and obtain management rights. Lee released a statement saying he was "moving toward the future".

After stepping down from SM, he has continued his vigorous activities, such as carrying out tree-planting efforts that had drawn great interest in his later years.

Upon leaving SM, Lee established a company called Blooming Grace, which will focus "on the fusion of culture and technology". He acquired part of the Chinese autonomous aerial vehicle company EHang. He later also founded a new entertainment company named A2O Entertainment.

== Personal life ==
Lee's wife, Kim Eun-jin, died from cancer on 30 September 2014.

Lee is the paternal uncle of Sunny, one of the members of the popular SM group Girls' Generation.

== Philanthropy ==
In 2014, Lee donated ₩500 million to the Korean Red Cross to help the victims of the Sewol ferry disaster. He directed the Asia performance of Global Citizen's charity concert, Global Goal Live: The Possible Dream. On 8 March 2022, he donated ₩500 million to the Hope Bridge Disaster Relief Association to help those affected by the massive wildfires that started in Uljin, Gyeongbuk. and also spread to Samcheok, Gangwon.

== Controversies ==
=== Embezzlement case and conviction ===
In 2002, the Supreme Prosecutors' Office of the Republic of Korea found evidence of Lee earning tens of billions of won worth of illegal market profits in August 1999 by acquiring 1.1 billion won worth of stocks when listing stocks of SM Entertainment at KOSDAQ by a paid-in capital increase. The Supreme Prosecutors' Office of the Republic of Korea also investigated Lee regarding circumstantial evidence of lobbying to producers in broadcasting stations and keeping a tremendous amount of cash in his personal office and vaults.

Lee tried to escape prosecution by staying overseas from June 2002, and was found in a golf course in Los Angeles on 2 August in the same year. While on the run, Lee's passport was nullified and Lee was chased by Interpol. Lee eventually came back to Korea to be investigated on 22 May 2003. A pre-arrest warrant was issued on 7 October, and Lee was arrested on 8 October. On 14 October, Lee was approved of bail after paying 30 million won. On 19 October, Lee was prosecuted without detention.

In September 2004, the Supreme Court of Korea sentenced Lee to two years of imprisonment along with three years of probation. Lee was released in a special exemption in 2007 commemorating the fourth year of Roh Moo-hyun's presidency.

=== Slave contract ===
In 2009, three members of the boy band TVXQ took their management agency SM Entertainment owned by Lee to court, claiming that the agency's 13-year-contract (often nicknamed a slave contract) was too long, too restrictive, and gave them almost none of the profits from their success. The following year, in 2010, South Korea's Fair Trade Commission (KFTC) created a rule that limited entertainment contracts to seven years.

=== Other controversies ===
In 2015, Lee Soo-man was alleged to have violated foreign exchange rules, having failed to report real estate purchased in Los Angeles, as mandated by the Foreign Exchange Law. His company responded that it was a "mistake" made by their American subsidiary. In 2021, he was included in the names of figures in the Pandora Papers. He was mentioned 399 times across 280 documents, tying him to eight paper companies in Hong Kong, five of which used a nominee service to conceal the source of their funds. SM Entertainment denied the allegations and said the companies had been founded using his father's assets. Lee and SM were investigated by the National Tax Service following suspicions that he had omitted financial information and leaked company money in corporate transactions. As a result, SM was ordered to pay the government 20.2 billion won.

== Discography ==
=== Albums ===
- Lee Soo-man (Jigu Records, 1977)
- Lee Soo-man (Shinsegae, 1978)
- 애창곡집 (Jigu Records, 1978)
- Greatest (Universal Record Co., 1980)
- Lee Soo-man (Shinsegae, 1983)
- Lee Soo-man (Han Kook Record, 1985)
- 끝이 없는 순간 (Asia Record Co., 1986)
- NEW AGE 2 (Han Kook Record, January 1989)
- NEW AGE (Asia Record Co., November 1989)

== Accolades ==
=== Awards ===
The name of the award ceremony, year presented, award category, nominee(s) of the award, and the result of the award
Award ceremony	Year	Category	Nominee / work	Result	Ref.
Academic Conference by Business Released Society		Small but Strong Business Entrepreneur Award	Lee Soo-man	Won	
Gaon Chart Music Awards	2012	K-Pop Contribution Award	Lee Soo-man	Won	
Gaon Chart Music Awards	2021	K-Pop Contribution Award	Lee Soo-man	Won	
Golden Disc Awards	2008	Record Producer of the Year	Lee Soo-man	Won	
Korea-China Management Awards	2018	CEO Award	Lee Soo-man	Won	
Korea Creative Content Agency	2005	Entertainment and Art Development Award	Lee Soo-man	Won	
Korea Creative Management	2019	Job Creation (Note: as producer of SM Entertainment; alongside Lee Sung-soo)	Lee Soo-man	Won	
Korea Creative Management	2020	Job Creation	Lee Soo-man	Won	
Korea Economic Daily	2020	Dasan Business Award	Lee Soo-man	Won	
Korea Music Copyright Awards	2011	Best Record Producer	Lee Soo-man	Won	
Kotler Awards	2017	Best Marketer Award	Lee Soo-man	Won	
MBC Drama Awards	1987	Radio Excellence Award	Lee Soo-man	Won	
MBC Music Festival	1976	Top 10 Male Rookie of the Year	Lee Soo-man	Won	
MBC Music Festival	1977	Top 10 Artist of Year	Lee Soo-man	Won	
SBS Gayo Daejeon	1997	Best Planner Award	Lee Soo-man	Won	
SBS Gayo Daejeon	1998	Best Planner Award	Lee Soo-man	Won	
SBS Gayo Daejeon	2004	Producer of the Year	Lee Soo-man	Won	
Seoul Cultural Arts Awards	2011	Best Popular Music Producer	Lee Soo-man	Won	
Seoul Music Awards	1977	Best Record Producer	Lee Soo-man	Won	
Seoul Music Awards	1997	Best Planner Award	Lee Soo-man	Won	
South-East Music Chart Awards	2005	The Best Overseas Producer Award	Lee Soo-man	Won	
Top Chinese Music The Annual Festival	2016	Best Producer of Asia Award	Lee Soo-man	Won	

=== State and cultural honors ===
Name of country or organization, year given, and name of honor
Country or organization	Year	Honor	Ref.
Asia Society	2016	Asia Game Changer Award	
Château Mouton Rothschild	2009	Commanderie de Bontemps	
International Business Society	2007	Global Frontier Award	
International Business Society	2007	Global CEO Award Winning Company Case Presentation and Awards	
Korea-EU Industrial Cooperation Day	2011	Korea-EU Cooperation Award	
Korea Society Anniversary Gala	2007	Dinner Culture Award	
Proud Korean Awards	2011	National Prestige Award	
Seoul International Forum	2016	Yeongsan Diplomat Award	
South Korea	2000	Good Deed Artist Prime Minister Commendation Award	
South Korea	2002	Korean Culture Content Exportation Awards in Music	
South Korea	2003	Korean Culture Content Exportation Awards in Music	
South Korea	2011	Eungwan Order of Cultural Merit (class 2nd)	
United States	2005	Certificate of Merit as Honorary Ambassador of Los Angeles	

=== Listicles ===
Name of publisher, year listed, name of listicle, and placement
Publisher	Year	Listicle	Placement	Ref.
Billboard	2020	Impact List	Placed	
E Daily	2016	Cultural Leaders of the Year	Placed	
Golden Disc Awards	2025	Golden Disc Powerhouse 40	Placed	
Herald Business	2011	The Power Leader of Popular Culture	1st	
Insight Korea	2018	The Best CEO by College Students	10th	
Insight Korea	2018	Executives Contributing to the National Economic Development	6th	
Insight Korea	2018	Executives Showing Best Leadership	4th	
Money Today Star News	2007	Cultural Industry Player in the Entertainment Business	1st	
Sisa Journal (Note: The Sisa Journal is one of the major weekly news magazines in Korea. Established in 1989, its annually conducted 'Who Moves Korea' survey determines the most influential figures in the country and highlights next-generation leaders of Korea. The survey is conducted on a total of 1000 experts across 10 fields, including professors, journalists, politicians, businessmen, and cultural artists.)	2005	Most Influential Person Moving the Entertainment Industry	Placed	
Sound	2011	Korean Pop Music Power 100	1st	
Variety	2017	Variety 500	Placed	
Variety	2018	Variety 500	Placed	
Variety	2018	International Music Leader	19th	
Variety	2019	International Music Leader	11th	
Variety	2019	Variety 500	Placed	
Variety	2020	Variety 500	Placed	

== Notes ==
1. as producer of SM Entertainment; alongside Lee Sung-soo
2. The Sisa Journal is one of the major weekly news magazines in Korea. Established in 1989, its annually conducted 'Who Moves Korea' survey determines the most influential figures in the country and highlights next-generation leaders of Korea. The survey is conducted on a total of 1000 experts across 10 fields, including professors, journalists, politicians, businessmen, and cultural artists.
