= The Moment: A Minor =

- Digital cover

EP by Kim Woojin
- Released: August 5, 2021
- Studio: 821 Sound (Seoul)
- Length: 18:13
- Languages: Korean; English
- Labels: 10x; Stone; Genie
- Producer: Jay

Kim Woojin chronology
The Moment: A Minor (2021)	Além do Guarda-Roupa (2023)

Singles from The Moment: A Minor
- 1. "Still Dream" Released: July 8, 2021; 2. "Ready Now" Released: August 5, 2021

Music videos
- "Still Dream" on YouTube "Ready Now" on YouTube "My Growing Pains" on YouTube "In My Space" on YouTube "Purple Sky" on YouTube

The Moment: A Minor (stylized as The moment: 未成年, a minor.) is the debut EP by South Korean singer Kim Woojin, released on August 5, 2021, by 10x Entertainment and distributed by Stone Music Entertainment and Genie Music. The EP consists of six tracks, including the pre-released single "Still Dream" and lead single "Ready Now".

Commercially, the EP peaked at number seven on the Gaon Album Chart. To promote the EP, Kim embarked on the Still Dream World Tour in July 2022.

== Background and release ==
In 2017, Kim competed in Mnet's reality survival show Stray Kids to become a member of JYP Entertainment's forthcoming boy group Stray Kids. Kim succeeded in becoming a member, and the group made their official debut March 26, 2018 with the EP I Am Not. On October 28, 2019, JYP announced Kim's departure from the group, citing personal circumstances.

In August 2020, Kim signed a recording contract with newly created record label 10x Entertainment, becoming the agency's first artist. On June 29, 2021, 10x announced that Kim would be releasing his first single, "Still Dream". The song, along with its music video, were released on July 8. Ten days later, Kim announced that The Moment: A Minor would be released on August 5. The album was officially released at 6:00pm on the 5th, along with its lead single "Ready Now", whose music video was released prior, at midnight that same day.

== Promotion ==
To promote the EP, Kim performed on several South Korean music programs. Kim performed "Still Dream" on MBC's Show! Music Core on July 17, and SBS M's The Show on August 10, as well as "Ready Now" on August 10, 17, and 31. He also performed "Ready Now" on SBS's Inkigayo on August 8, 15, and 22, MBC Plus's Show Champion on August 11, 18, and 25, Mnet's M Countdown on August 12 and September 2, KBS's Music Bank on August 13 and 27, and Arirang TV's Simply K-Pop on August 13, 20, and September 3.

Kim also promoted the EP with a performance of "Ready Now" on MBC's It's Live.

== Commercial performance ==
The Moment: A Minor debuted on the Gaon Album Chart issued August 7 at number seven, selling 15,448 copies in less than three days of tracking. The following week, the EP fell to number 33. On Circle's monthly rankings, the album charted at number 37 for August 2021.

== Track listing ==
Credits adapted from the EP's liner notes and Naver Vibe.

The Moment: A Minor track listing
No.	Title	Lyrics	Music	Arrangement	Length
1.	"Intro: Alea Iacta Est."	Kim Woojin; Jay	ByHVN (153/Joombas)	ByHVN	0:46
2.	"Ready Now"	Kim; Jay; Znee	Sean Michael Alexander; Sqvare; Val Del Prete (153/Joombas); Alysa (153/Joombas)	Alysa	3:17
3.	"My Growing Pains"	Kim; Jay; Isram	Ryan S. Jhun; Gustav Nyström; Hilda Stenmalm; Wilhelm Börjesson	Jhun; Nyström	3:21
4.	"Still Dream"	Kim; Jay; Znee	Jhun; John Samuel Gerhart; Joe Henderson; Zachariah Palmer	Jhun; Gerhart; Henderson	3:32
5.	"In My Space"	Kim; Isran; Hwang Seon-young	Jhun; Cameron Warren	Jhun; Cameron Warren	3:42
6.	"Purple Sky"	Kim; Jay; Lee Hyun-do; D. June	Lee; Jaeman; Glow	Lee; D. June	3:33
Total length:					18:13

Notes

- "Intro: Alea Iacta Est." is stylized as "Intro : Alea iata est."
- "My Growing Pains", and "In My Space" are stylized in sentence case.

== Charts ==
=== Weekly charts ===
Weekly chart performance for The Moment: A Minor
Chart (2021)	Peak position
South Korean Albums (Gaon)	7

=== Monthly charts ===
Monthly chart performance for The Moment: A Minor
Chart (2021)	Position
South Korean Albums (Gaon)	37

== Release history ==
Release history for The Moment: A Minor
Region	Date	Format	Label
South Korea	August 5, 2021	CD	10x; Stone; Genie
Various	August 5, 2021	Digital download; streaming	10x
