= Line Music =

Japanese music streaming service

- Screenshot Main website of the Line Music
- Original author: Line Corporation
- Release: 22 May 2015
- Operating system: Launch: iOS; Android; Later: Windows; OS X
- Platform: Cross-platform
- Available in: Chinese; Japanese
- Type: Music streaming
- License: Proprietary
- Website: music.line.me

Line Music (stylized in all caps) is a subscription-based music streaming service by Line Corporation (now LY Corporation) that combines existing Line Messenger app with the entertainment system that users not only can stream the music on-demand, but users can share the music directly to Line Messenger. The chairman for the Line Music division is Lim-Suk Jun. The Line Music app is an alternative version of Naver VIBE in South Korea. It is considered as the biggest listening app in the country.

== History ==
=== Announcement ===
In December 2014, Line Corporation reveals their plan to expanding their Line product range beyond its messaging service Line to provide a one-stop entertainment portal where users can use Line services to consume media, which this plan was made in October 2014. This expansion has been announced during the Line annual event, at the same time the company also announces the introduction of online Manga service and also new game ventures, with investment of music streaming division worth ¥480 million. Line Corporation, in the early stage, has signed deals with Sony Music Japan and Avex Group to allow their works to be streamed on their services once the service has been launched. Following the announcement in the same month, Line Corporation acquired MixRadio from Microsoft to make its expansion to music industry globally. Line Corporation, however, stated that MixRadio will continue to operate separately from the parent company.

=== Launch in Thailand ===
Line Music was initially launched in Thailand where Thailand is the second largest Line messenger market share in the world after Japan, with 33 million registered users using this service, compared to the Japanese market, with 58 million registered users. Line has signed deals with major labels in Thailand such as RS Music, BEC-TERO, SpicyDisc and What The Duck to allow their works to be streamed in this service.

On 25 August 2016, Line Thailand announced their intention to shut down and move to Line TV on 1 October 2016.

=== Expansion to Japan ===
On 11 June 2015, Line Corporation launched Line Music in Japan, with new deals with major labels have been signed, such as Warner Music Group, Universal Music Group and King Records.

=== Expansion to Taiwan ===
On 10 July 2019, Line Corporation started to provide Line Music service in Taiwan.

== Features ==
=== Catalogue ===
At the launch, Line currently has 1.5 million licensed tracks from 30 music labels and publishers worldwide. But the company will expand their catalogue to 30 million licensed tracks by 2016.

=== Integration with Line messenger ===
One of the main features of the Line Music is the integration with the Line Messenger, where users can send music tracks or playlists to friends or chat groups in Line Messenger. In addition, users can stream the music simultaneously with the person the user is chatting with in order to hear the music at the same time. A user without a Line Music subscription can preview the music for up to 30 seconds only.

== Promotion ==
On 11 July 2015, Line Corporation aired its first television commercial about Line Music in Japan. In this video, a girl is dancing and singing at home while listening to Carly Rae Jepsen's latest single, I Really Like You.

== Competition ==
Before the launch of the Line Music in Thailand, Deezer, Rdio and Tidal were the only competitors in the Thai music streaming market, at the time where other major services such as Spotify are still absent in Thai market.

However, unlike in Thailand, Japan did not have any major streaming services launched in their country such as Spotify, Rdio, Deezer, Xbox Music, Pandora Radio etc., with the exception of Music Unlimited by Sony Entertainment Network prior to the launch of Line Music. However the pricing for the monthly subscription of Music Unlimited was high at ¥1,480 due to Sony's monopolistic practices and also their decision to withhold their catalogues from iTunes Store until end of 2012. However, after the closure of the Music Unlimited and with the Sony's announcement to replace its service with PlayStation Music which is powered by Spotify on 28 January 2015. On 30 June 2015, Apple launched Apple Music worldwide, which makes it the third competitor in music streaming industry in Japan.

== Availability ==
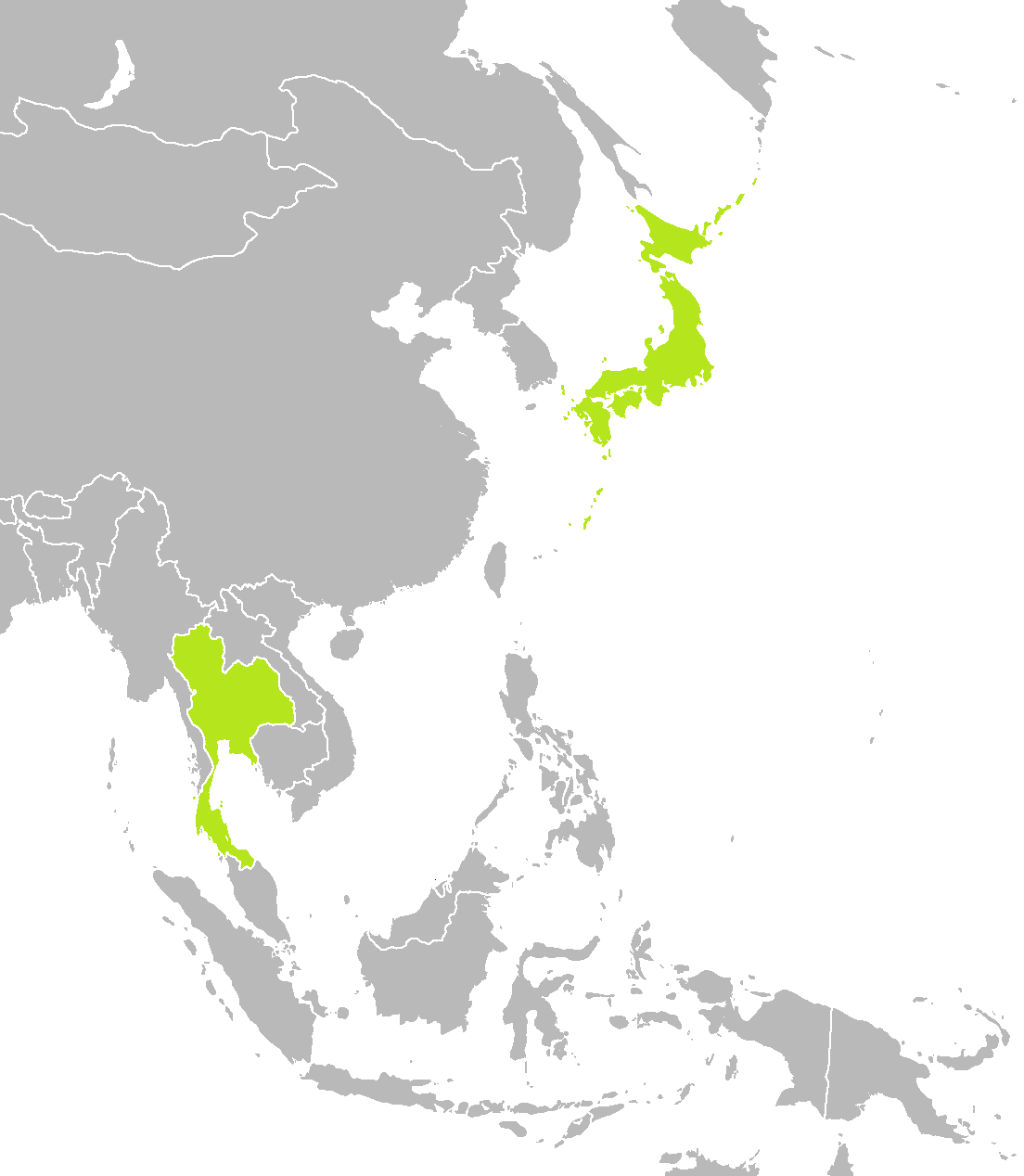
Availability of Line Music in Asia as of August 2015

Line Music is currently available in Japan, Thailand and Taiwan.

== Reception ==
The reception for the Line Music was well received by the customers in both Japan and Thailand with 6.2 million downloads within the first months of availability.

== Accounts and subscriptions ==
Line Music provides different types of accounts, vary by countries. Currently, Line Music provide free-tier account in Taiwan.

Name	Price	Free of Ads	Listening time	Bit rate
20 Hours Listening (Japan only)	¥500 per month	Yes	20 hours only per month	320 kbit/s, 192 kbit/s or 64 kbit/s
Unlimited	¥1000/60฿ per month; 1-month (Thailand)/2-month (Japan) free trialNTD$149 and 180: In Japan, students can only pay ¥300 per month with a valid student card.	Yes	Unlimited	320 kbit/s, 192 kbit/s or 64 kbit/s
Unlimited (Taiwan)	NTD$149 and 180; Plan WOW 149 provides three tickets for personalized Line Ring Tone and Ring Back Tone per month; Plan WOW 180 provides unlimited tickets for personalized Line Ring Tone and Ring Back Tone.	Yes	Unlimited	320 kbit/s or 192 kbit/s

== See also ==
- Naver VIBE
