= Kim Nam-il (writer) =

South Korean writer

Kim Nam-il (Korean: 김남일; born 1957) is a South Korean writer. He made his literary debut in 1983 when his short story “Beri” (베리 Berry) appeared in the journal Literature of Our Age. He published his first novel Cheongnyeon ilgi (청년일기 Diary of Youth) in 1987, and has since written various works of fiction, nonfiction, and literary journalism. He is also a senior researcher at Asia Culture Network. He is the winner of the 1st Jeon Tae-il Literary Award, 2nd Beautiful Writer Award, 17th Violet Literary Award, 23rd Jeon Tae-il Literary Award, and the 2012 Kwon Jeong-saeng grant for creative writing.

== Life ==
Kim Nam-il was born in Suwon, South Korea in 1957. He studied Dutch at Hankuk University of Foreign Studies and made his literary debut in 1983. He was the managing editor for the Writers Association of Korea (then the Association of Writers Practicing Freedom) from 1984 to 1990 and has served as its Secretary-General since 2010.

Kim became the president of the publisher Silcheon Munhak in March 2014, but stepped down in March 2016 when a conflict with its majority shareholders led to the resignation of its quarterly journal Literature and Practice’s entire editorial board. Kim signed a joint statement by writers declaring that they would not have any of their works published by Silcheon Munhak. In 2016, it was revealed that Kim was placed on a blacklist of artists and organizations excluded from government support programs for speaking out against the Park Geun-hye administration. Silcheon Munhak was also on the list.

== Writing ==
Kim Nam-il is primarily concerned with social criticism, which is apparent in both his personal history and literary work. When he debuted as a writer in 1983, many of his South Korean contemporaries took an interest in labor issues. One critic described his early work as “relying heavily on experience and investigation for creative inspiration” and as portraying “our times and himself most candidly without exaggeration.” Minimizing imagination and embellishment in favor of authenticity, Kim’s early writings fell somewhere between fiction and documentary. This contrasts with other works of Korean fiction in the 1980s, which were so focused on ideas of social change, the masses, labor, and revolution that they tended to idealize the struggles of laborers and farmers. While Kim raised the same questions as his contemporaries, he managed to avoid their pitfalls.

In the 1980s, many South Korean intellectuals embraced socialism in response to anticommunism, the division of the Korean peninsula, the Gwangju Uprising and the ensuing massacre perpetrated by the government. Literature was replete with symbols of the populace, labor, and revolution. These trends were a reaction against the state violence enacted by the government of Chun Doo-hwan, who assumed presidency in 1980 through a coup. But South Korea’s democratization in 1987, rapid economic growth and rise of capitalism catapulted by the 1988 Seoul Olympics, and the fall of socialism in Eastern Europe between 1989 and 1991 were some of the various factors that brought sweeping changes to the South Korean intellectual society. Many writers who were active in the 1980s could not adjust to these changes and failed to carry on their writing.

Kim Nam-il is one of the few writers from the 1980s who continued to publish into the 1990s. Such writers often wrote about their discomfort or frustration with the changing world and people, but Kim took a different approach. He began to ask what makes human existence meaningless, and reflected on the power of memory to turn a period of oblivion into a period of creating meaning. Kim sees memory as being equivalent to the hope for a better life. His works express hope for a better world and a better life, while representing the voices of marginalized or disadvantaged groups.

== Works ==
1. 라마야나 (2016)

Ramayana (2016)

2. 문익환 (2014)

Moon Ik-hwan (2014)

3. 스토리텔링 하노이 (2012)

Storytelling Hanoi (2012)

4. 우리 민족 최고의 이야기꾼 홍명희 (2011)

Hong Myong-hui, the Best Storyteller of Korea (2011)

5. 천재토끼 차상문 (2010)

Cha Sang-moon the Genius Rabbit (2010)

6. 소중한 생명을 다루는 의사 (2009)

Doctors Deal with Precious Lives (2009)

7. 산을 내려가는 법 (2007)

How to Go Down a Mountain (2007)

8. 늘 푸른 역사가 신채호 (2007)

Shin Chaeho, Forever a Historian (2007)

9. 모래도시의 비밀 (2006)

The Secret of the Sand City (2006)

10. 책 (2006)

Books (2006)

11. 전우치전 (2006)

The Story of Jeon Woo-chi (2006)

12. 노구치 히데요 05 (2005)

Vol. 5: Hideyo Noguchi (2005)

13. 전태일 32 (2005)

Vol 32: Jeon Tae-il (2005)

14. 이중섭 09 (2005)

Vol 9: Lee Jung-seob (2005)

15. 엘리너 루스벨트 30 (2005)

Vol. 30: Eleanor Roosevelt (2005)

16. 골목이여, 안녕 (2004)

Goodbye, Alleys (2004)

17. 라이트 형제 (2004)

The Wright Brothers (2004)

18. 통일 할아버지 문익환 (2002)

Moon Ik-hwan the Old Reunification Advocate (2002)

19. 세상의 어떤 아침 (1997)

One Morning in the World (1997)

20. 국경 3부 1, 2 (1996)

National Border Book 3 Volumes 1-2 (1996)

21. 국경 2부 1, 2 (1995)

National Border Book 2 Volumes 1-2 (1995)

22. 국경 1부 1, 2, 3 (1993)

National Border Book 1 Volumes 1-3 (1996)

23. 은혜갚은 까치 (1993)

The Magpie That Repaid Its Debt (1993)

24. 떠돌이꽃의 여행 (1993)

Travels of the Wandering Flower (1993)

25. 나무꾼과 선녀 (1992)

The Woodcutter and the Fairy (1992)

26. 마니오크가 된 마니 (1992)

Mani Who Became Manioc (1992)

27. 천하무적 (1992)

Invincible (1992)

28. 일과 밥과 자유 (1988)

Work, Food, and Freedom (1988)

29. 전진하는 동지여 (1988)

Dear Comrade Marching Forward (1988)

30. 청년일기 (1987)

Diary of Youth (1987)

=== Works in Translation ===
1. บ้านหลังนี้มีแต่รอยยิ้ม (Thai)

2. ทะเลและผีเสื้อ (Thai)

== Awards ==
1. 2010: 17th Violet Literary Award

2. 2010: 2nd Beautiful Writer Award

3. 1989: 1st Jeon Tae-il Literary Award
