= Hankuk University of Foreign Studies =

Private university in South Korea

- 한국외국어대학교
- Motto: Veritas, Pax, Creatio
- Motto in English: "Truth, Peace, Creation"
- Type: Private research university
- Established: 1954; 72 years ago
- Founder: Kim Heung-bae
- President: Kang Gi-hoon (강기훈)
- Academic staff: 613
- Students: 27,351
- Undergraduates: 23,661
- Postgraduates: 3,690
- Location: 서울특별시 동대문구 이문로 107 (107 Imun-ro, Dongdaemun-gu, Seoul) 경기도 용인시 처인구 모현읍 외대로81 (81 Oedae-ro, Mohyeon-eup, Cheoin-gu, Yongin-si, Gyeonggi-do), Seoul, Yongin, South Korea; 37.564771°N 126.939358°E
- Campus: Seoul Campus (located in Seoul) Global Campus (located in Yongin)
- Colors: Bluish-green
- Website: www.hufs.ac.kr

Korean name
- Hangul: 한국외국어대학교
- Hanja: 韓國外國語大學校
- RR: Hanguk oegugeo daehakgyo
- MR: Han'guk oegugŏ taehakkyo

Hankuk University of Foreign Studies (abbreviated as HUFS; Korean: 한국외국어대학교) is a private research university in Seoul, South Korea. The university currently teaches 45 foreign languages. In addition, it contains studies in humanities, law, political science, social sciences, business, medical science, natural sciences, and engineering.

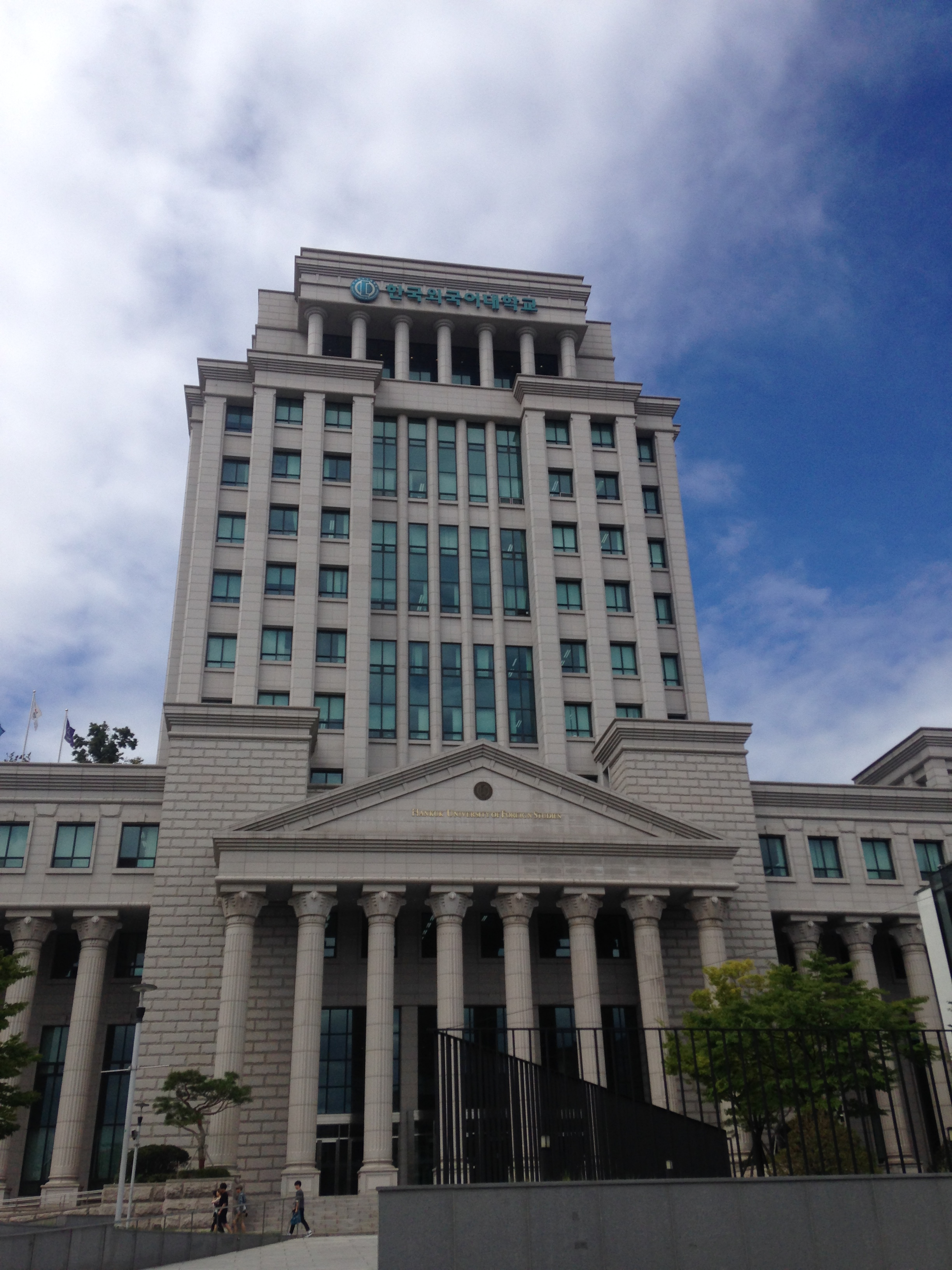
Main Building of Hankuk University of Foreign Studies (HUFS)

== History ==
In April 1954, HUFS was founded as a college for studying foreign languages in by Kim Heung-bae with its first students studying English, French, Chinese, German, Spanish and Russian.

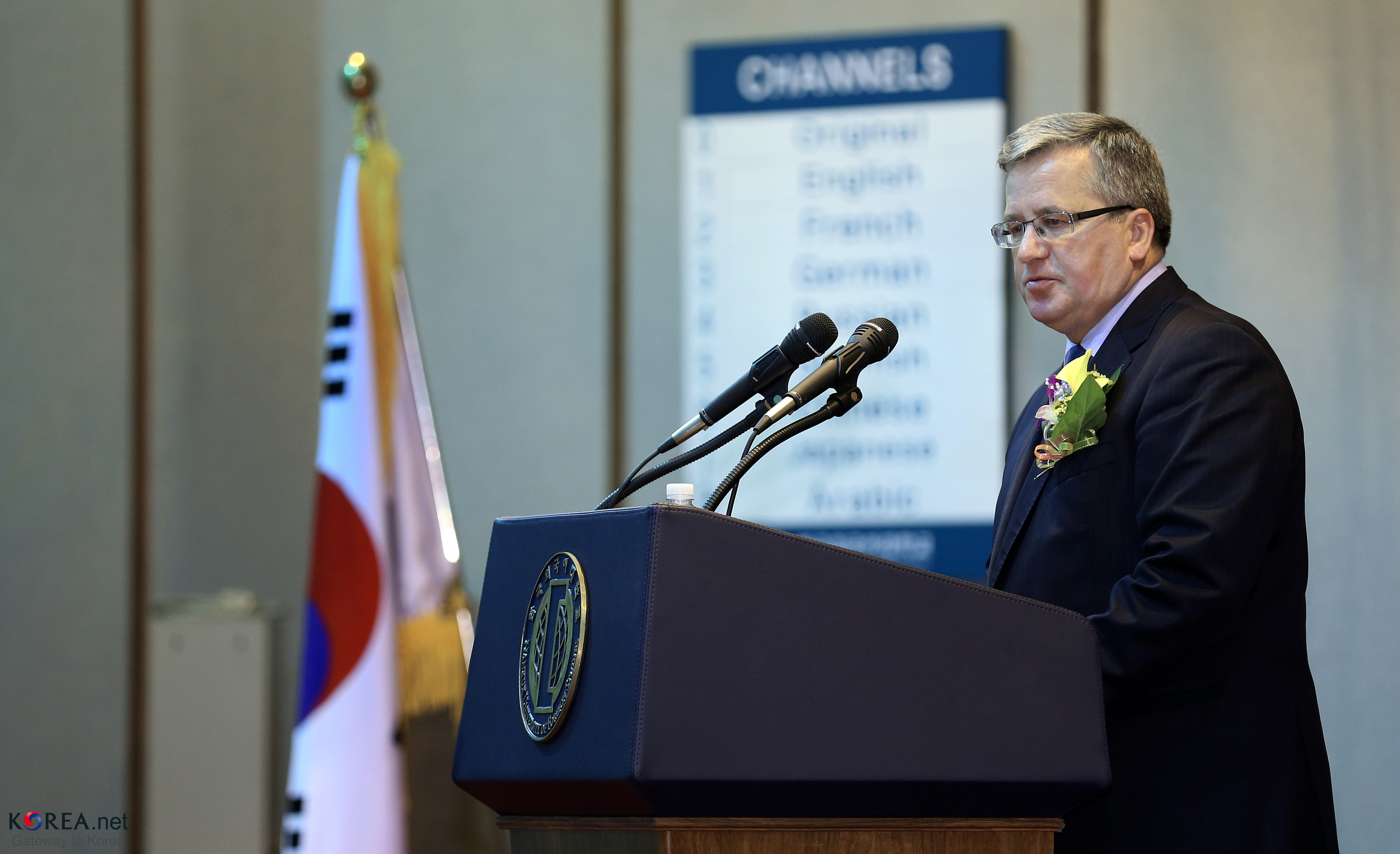
Polish President Bronisław Komorowski giving a lecture at Hankuk University, October 2013.

In 2012, U.S President Barack Obama, during his visit to Korea, spoke at Hankuk University in Seoul about global progress toward nuclear non-proliferation.

Throughout its history, the university has been visited by numerous foreign dignitaries, including Crown Princess Victoria of Sweden, Joko Widodo of Indonesia, Viktor Orban of Hungary, Abdullah Gul of Turkey, Tsakhiagiin Elbegdorj of Mongolia, Bronislaw Komorowski of Poland, and many others.

== Education ==
Hankuk University of Foreign Studies has over 50 departments covering Social Sciences, Eastern European Studies, Humanities, Asia-African Studies, and Natural Sciences. The university contributes to regional studies, with graduate courses in international and regional studies.

Since 2004 the closely associated Cyber Hankuk University of Foreign Studies, based at Hankuk University of Foreign Studies, has been offering online courses in English, Japanese and Mandarin Chinese, as well as business administration, journalism, and mass communication.

HUFS runs a foreign language examination system (FLEX). The FLEX Center is developing examinations for 19 languages in addition to the seven languages currently administered (English, French, German, Russian, Spanish, Chinese, and Japanese). It plans for 26 languages more.

As of October 2014, Hankuk University of Foreign Studies has academic exchange program agreements with 431 universities and 139 institutions throughout 88 nations.

=== Academic reputation ===
University rankings
JoongAng National	Domestic	=18
QS National	General	21
QS Asia (Asia version)	General	=124
QS World	General	651–660
USNWR World	General	=1705

HUFS regularly ranks among the top universities in South Korea, especially in the fields of humanities and social sciences.

In 2020, eight HUFS students passed the Korean diplomat bar exam, the second most in the country behind only Seoul National University. In 2019, the school ranked third in the country with six successful examinees.

=== FLEX ===
Under the foreign language certification system, students who have double majors are required to achieve certain scores on the FLEX (Foreign Language EXamination) test for graduation, apart from graduation certification. In principle, students need to receive certification on their proficiency in foreign language.

There are many languages in FLEX, including English, Chinese, Japanese, German, French, Russian, Spanish, Italian, Turkish, Indian languages, Vietnamese, Bulgarian, Hungarian, Polish, Dutch and so on.

=== Law School ===
Hankuk University of Foreign Studies has a school of law, making it one of the 25 universities in Korea which have a law school.

=== Graduate School of TESOL ===
HUFS Graduate School of TESOL is divided into two concentrations: the Department of English Language Teaching and the Department of ELT Contents Development. The program offers late afternoon and evening courses for working students who are unable to attend classes during the day.

=== Other fields ===
- Graduate School of Education
- Graduate School of Politics, Government and Communication
- Graduate School of Business

== Campus ==
The university is composed of two campuses, the Seoul Campus located in Imun-dong of Seoul, and the Global Campus in Yongin.

The Seoul Campus is focused on major languages, humanities, and social sciences, while the Global Campus teaches additional languages not provided in Seoul, namely Polish, Romanian, Czech, Slovak, Hungarian, Serbian, Croatian, Ukrainian, Greek, Bulgarian, Central Asian languages (Kazakh and Uzbek) and African languages (such as Swahili), as well as engineering and natural sciences.

The university is currently planning on building a third campus focused on artificial intelligence and big data in Songdo International Business District, after having secured 300 billion won in investment funding from Korea Investment & Securities, Hyundai Engineering & Construction, and ZINOL D&C.

== College divisions ==
=== Seoul Campus ===
- College of English
  - Department of English Linguistics and Language Technology (ELLT)
  - Department of English Literature and Culture
  - Department of English for International Conferences and Communication (EICC)
- College of Occidental Languages
  - Division of French
    - Applied French Linguistics and Literature
    - FATI
    - French and European Studies
  - Department of German
  - Department of Russian
  - Department of Spanish
  - Department of Italian
  - Department of Portuguese
  - Department of Dutch
  - Department of Scandinavian Languages
- College of Asian Languages & Cultures
  - Department of Malay-Indonesian
  - Department of Arabic
  - Department of Thai
  - Department of Vietnamese
  - Department of Hindi
  - Department of Turkish and Azerbaijani
  - Department of Persian
  - Department of Mongolian
- College of Chinese
  - Division of Chinese Language, Literature and Culture
  - Division of Chinese Foreign Affairs and Commerce
- College of Japanese
  - Division of Japanese Language, Literature and Culture
  - Division of Integrated Japanese Studies
- College of Social Sciences
  - Department of Political Science and Diplomacy
  - Department of Public Administration
  - Division of Media & Communication
    - Journalism & Information
    - Broadcasting∙Film∙New Media
    - Advertising∙Public Relations∙Branding
- College of Business and Economics
  - Department of International Economics & Law
  - Division of Economics
- Business School
  - Business Administration Division
- College of Education
  - Department of English Education
  - Department of French Education
  - Department of German Education
  - Department of Korean Education
  - Department of Chinese Education
- Division of International Studies
  - Division of International Studies
- Division of Language & Diplomacy
  - Division of Language & Diplomacy
- Division of Language & Trade
  - Division of Language & Trade
- Division of Korean as a Foreign Language
  - Division of Korean as a Foreign Language
- Minerva College (Seoul)
  - Minerva College - Center for Writing & International Ethics (Non-Diploma)

=== Global Campus ===
- College of Interpretation and Translation
  - School of English for Interpretation and Translation
    - English-Korean Interpretation and Translation Studies
    - Interpretation and Translation for International Trade and Relations in English-Speaking Areas
    - English Literature and Translation
    - TESOL & English Linguistics
  - Department of German Interpretation and Translation
  - Department of Spanish Interpretation and Translation
  - Department of Italian Interpretation and Translation
  - Department of Chinese Interpretation and Translation
  - Department of Japanese Interpretation and Translation
  - Department of Thai Interpretation and Translation
  - Department of Arabic Interpretation and Translation
  - Department of Malay-Indonesian Interpretation and Translation
- College of Central and East European Studies
  - Department of Polish
  - Department of Romanian
  - Department of Czech and Slovak Studies
  - Department of Hungarian
  - Department of South Slavic Studies
  - Department of Ukrainian Studies
- College of International and Area Studies
  - Department of French Studies
  - Department of Brazilian Studies
  - Department of Greek Studies and Bulgarian Studies
  - Department of Indian Studies
  - Department of Central Asian Studies
  - Division of African Studies
    - East African Studies
    - West African Studies
    - South African Studies
  - Department of Russian Studies
  - Department of Korean Studies
  - Division of International Sports and Leisure
- College of Humanities
  - Department of Linguistics and Cognitive Science
  - Department of Philosophy
  - Department of History
  - Department of Knowledge and Contents
- College of Economics and Business
  - Division of Global Business and Technology
  - Department of International Finance
  - Department of Management Information Systems
- College of Natural Science
  - Department of Mathematics
  - Department of Statistics
  - Department of Electronic Physics
  - Department of Environmental Science
  - Department of Bioscience and Biotechnology
  - Department of Chemistry
- College of Engineering
  - Department of Computer Engineering
  - Department of Information Communications Engineering
  - Division of Semiconductor and Electronics Engineering
  - Department of Industrial and Management Engineering
- Division of Biomedical Engineering
- Minerva College (Global)
  - Minerva College - Center for Writing & International Ethics (Non-Diploma)- not an official college nor a division but offers a variety of lectures. Based on these, students choose to take a course to fill out the credits. HUFS undergraduates are supposed to take "Minerva Liberal Arts Lecture(1), Minerva Liberal Arts Lecture(2)", which are mandatory courses for graduation as well as "Freshmen Seminar" in each department. They contain information on history, linguistics, communications, philosophy, politics, discussion, debates, and report and essay, all of which are based on Humanity Studies.

=== Graduate school ===
- Humanities
  - English Linguistics
  - English Literature
  - English Translation
  - French Language and Literature
  - German Language and Literature
  - Russian Language and Literature
  - Spanish Language and Literature
  - TESOL (Teaching English to Speakers of Other Languages)
  - Japanese Language and Literature
  - Chinese Language and Literature
  - Middle East Languages and Literature (Arabic Linguistics, Arabic Literature)
  - Central and East European Languages and Literature
  - Korean Language and Literature
  - Comparative Literature
  - Linguistics and Cognitive Science
  - Philosophy
  - History
  - Information and Archival Science
  - Global Culture & Contents
  - Turkic·Central
- Social Science
  - International Affairs
  - Political Science and International Relations
  - Public Administration
  - Law
  - Communication and Information
  - International Economics and Law
  - Economics
  - Management
  - Management Information Systems
  - International Business
- Natural Science
  - Mathematics
  - Physics
  - Chemistry
  - Statistics
  - Environmental Science and Engineering
  - Bioscience and Biotechnology
- Engineering
  - Information Communications Engineering
  - Electronics Engineering
  - Computer and Electronic Systems Engineering
  - Industrial and Management Engineering

=== Graduate School of Interpretation and Translation ===
The Graduate School of Interpretation and Translation (GSIT) is a postgraduate education institution specializing in the education of professional conference interpreters and translators.

Founded in 1979 in response to the growing demand for international language specialists, GSIT currently offers master's degree courses in interpretation/translation in eight different languages: English, French, German, Russian, Spanish, Chinese, Japanese and Arabic. GSIT created the nation's first doctoral program in interpretation/translation in November 1999, to help stimulate research activities in the discipline, and has awarded 26 Ph.D. degrees as of 2012. It became the first Asian education institution to join CIUTI (Conférence Internationale Permanente d'Instituts Universitaires de Traducteurs et Interprètes) in 2004. GSIT is equipped with an international conference hall which provides for simultaneous interpretation services in eight different languages, lecture halls equipped with simultaneous interpretation booths, multimedia classrooms, group study rooms, a satellite broadcast resources center which provides access to 110 channels in 30 languages, a library, and a computer lab.

=== Graduate School of International and Area Studies (GSIAS) ===
- European Union Studies: focused on the EU's politics, security, economy, society, and culture and those of its member states.
- Latin American Studies :contains graduate seminars and special lectures; consists of courses focusing on understanding the macro-region's political development and democracy, political economy, and international relations. The economy/business track is composed of courses on Latin America's macro-economy, the region's interaction with the world economy, and regional economic integration. The society/culture concentration consists of courses providing a broad understanding of Latin American and Caribbean society covering history, culture, social structure, and changes in race and religion. Thanks to a grant from the Korea Institute for International Economic Policy, the Latin American Studies Department offers a course each semester alternating between a Latin America Policy Seminar and a Latin American Business Seminar. High-ranking officials from Korean and foreign governments, domestic and international organizations and firms, as well as scholars and experts are invited to present lectures in these courses.
- Korean Studies
- Chinese Studies
- Japanese Studies
- Russian and CIS Studies
- Indian and ASEAN Studies
- Middle East and African Studies
- United Nations Peace Studies (dual degree)
- Department of Southeast Asia and India covers eleven countries. Mainland Southeast Asia includes Thailand, Myanmar, Laos, Cambodia, and Vietnam. Islands in Southeast Asia include Malaysia, Singapore, Indonesia, the Philippines, Brunei, and East Timor. South Asia includes India, Pakistan, Bangladesh, Sri Lanka, Nepal, Bhutan, and the Maldives. The department offers interdisciplinary Master's and Ph.D. degrees in this macro-region. As with the other GSIAS departments, students choose a concentration in politics, economy, or society and culture, and one of the languages of South Asia or Southeast Asia. The department curriculum is designed for individuals who want to enrich their knowledge of the South or Southeast Asia region, taking into account regional organizations like ASEAN and SAARC. Students entering the program are usually interested in careers in the foreign service, government, international assistance/development enterprises, or teaching. The GSIAS program has special strengths in Indonesia, Malaysia, Thailand, Vietnam, and India.
- U.S. and Canadian Studies Department: the department's multidisciplinary with graduate seminars and special lectures, divided into three fields: politics and diplomacy, economy and management, and society and culture. The politics and diplomacy track consists of courses both on domestic political progress and structure and on diplomacy and national security. The economy/management track studies North American finance and international management policies in the changing global business environment. The society/culture track provides a systematic understanding of the culture of the North American region from its history and popular culture to social structure and changes in family and race. All course work is done in English. The Department of International Development Studies was established in 2010. The GSIAS established the Department of International Studies during the first semester of 2017 and recruited the first students for its master's degree program during the second semester of 2017. The Department faculty has recognized strengths in teaching and researching in the fields of International Security, Cultural Heritage, International Organizations and International Trade.

The GSIAS has concluded numerous MOUs and cooperative relationships with institutions within and outside Korea, such as the Ministry of Foreign Affairs and Trade (MOFAT), the Ministry of Education, Science and Technology (MEST), the Korea Institute for International Economic Policy (KIEP), the National Research Fund (NRF), the Seoul Development Institute (SDI), etc., to carry out various research projects. It also created in early 2010 a GSIAS-affiliated think-tank, named the Center for International Cooperation and Strategy (CICS), aimed at facilitating policy-relevant research activities and outreach programs. The Center hosted a major international conference in June 2010 under the title "Towards an East Asian Community: Why and How?" In December 2010, CICS organized a high-level Korea-Middle East Forum in Cairo jointly with the Al-Ahram Institute for Strategic Studies and MOFAT.

== Additional educational organizations ==
- Foreign Language Testing and Training: The foreign language training institute was established in 1974 with support from the government and the Korea International Trade Association to provide language training to public officials and staff of companies who do business abroad.
- Center for Interpretation and Translation: The agency specializes in interpretation and translation studies.
- Center for Korean Language and Culture: The Center for Korean Language and Culture is an educational institute that provides Korean language education to help people from around the world to achieve a good command of Korean and a correct understanding of Korean culture while also nurturing Korean language teachers.
- i-HUFS Enterprise: A school-based business, i-HUFS Enterprise was founded in November 2003 to apply the knowledge and information about languages and culture that HUFS retains for the education of students and for study by professors toward research to develop educational programs that can generate profit.
- Global Leadership Academy: The Global Leadership Academy opened in 2001 to produce area experts based on education in 45 major languages used worldwide and the area studies programs available at HUFS.
- University Press Center: Established in 1954 together with the university, the University Press Center has published 39 foreign language dictionaries including Korea's first Russian-Korean dictionary in 1963 and a 'Practical Malay∙Indonesian-Korean dictionary' in 2008.
- FLEX Center: The center was established to manage and operate FLEX (Foreign Language Examination). FLEX was developed by HUFS and is jointly administered with the Korea Chamber of Commerce and Industry. Tests are administered in seven languages: English, French, German, Russian, Spanish, Chinese, and Japanese.
- HUFS TESOL Professional Education Center: In response to the rising demand for English teachers equipped with language and teaching knowledge, the HUFS TESOL (Teaching English to Speakers of Other Languages) Professional Education Center was established as an independent educational institution. The center offers all instruction required of English education professionals including teaching methods and application of theory to the field, as well as the evaluation, review, and production of learning materials in addition to English language training.
- Seoul Institute for Continuing Education: The Seoul Institute for Continuing Education was established in August 2010 to realize the philosophy of continuing education. It serves local communities by granting public access to HUFS teaching faculty and educational infrastructure.
- Since its establishment in 1996, the Korean Studies Department has a scholarship program for international students.The HUFS-UPEACE dual degree program is the first established in Asia in 2007. Students study one year each in Korea and Costa Rica. Upon program completion students earn a dual master's degree from the Hankuk University of Foreign Studies and the United Nations Mandated University for Peace (UPEACE).
- GSIAS has conducted overseas exchange and internship programs with such institutions as MOFAT, Korea Trade Agency (KOTRA), and a number of domestic and international organizations. In the second half of 2010, the European Union (EU) and MEST jointly selected GSIAS as the lead Korean institute for the Education Cooperation Program between the EU and Korea for the following three years. GSIAS has also succeeded, in collaboration with the Institute for EU Studies, in hosting the EU Centre in Korea Project within the University from the European Commission in the same year. A "Global e-School Program in Korean Studies" was introduced within GSIAS in 2011, with the financial support from the Korea Foundation.

== Ranking ==
In the QS Ranking 2024, the university was ranked 575th in the world.

== Notable alumni ==
=== Politics, government and public service ===
- Cho Kwang-han, mayor of Namyangju
- Cho Won-jin, politician
- Chung Bong-ju, politician
- Kim Byong-joon, politician
- Kim Chong-in, former leader of both the ruling Democratic Party of Korea and the main opposition People Power Party in South Korea
- Oh Se-hoon, mayor of Seoul
- Pang Ha-nam, former Minister of Employment and Labor
- Yu Eui-dong, politician

=== Academia ===
- Kim Eun-kyung, professor
- Yongcheol Shin, economist and professor at the University of York
- Joo-Heon Shin, professor at Johns Hopkins School of Medicine and director at the Lieber Institute for Brain Development

=== Business ===
- Gene Yoon, chairman of Fila
- Lee Sung-soo, CEO of SM Entertainment
- Moon Kook-hyun, former CEO of Yuhan-Kimberly and presidential candidate in the 2007 South Korean presidential election
- Chen Kang, chairman of Assetplus Asset Management
- Chung Kyo-sun, vice chairman of the Hyundai Department Store Group
- Kwon Oh-gap, chairman of HD Hyundai

=== Entertainment ===
- Ahn Sung-ki
- Go Youn-ha
- Ha Jae-sook
- Jin Hyo-sang
- Kim Ji-seok
- Kim Joon
- Kim Nam-gil
- Kim Seong-hun
- Park Sung-woong
- Woo Hye-rim
- Amyflamy

=== Hostage ===
- Kim Sun Il

=== Literature ===
- Kim Nam-il
- Son Sohui
