= Dongdaemun A =

Constituency of the South Korean National Assembly

- Single-member constituency for the National Assembly
- Location of the constituency
- District(s): Dongdaemun District (part)
- Region: Seoul
- Electorate: 160,115 (2016)

Current constituency
- Created: 1988
- Seats: 1
- Party: Democratic Party
- Member: Ahn Gyu-back
- Council constituency: Dongdaemun 1st district Dongdaemun 2nd district
- Created from: Dongdaemun

Dongdaemun A (Korean: 동대문구 갑; Hanja: 東大門區 甲) is a constituency of the National Assembly of South Korea. The constituency consists of part of Dongdaemun District, Seoul. As of 2016, 160,115 eligible voters were registered in the constituency.

== List of members of the National Assembly ==
Election	Member	Party	Dates	Notes
1988	Choi Hoon	Peace Democratic	1988–1992	
1992	Roh Seung-woo	Democratic Liberal	1992–2000	
1996	Roh Seung-woo	New Korea	1992–2000	
2000	Kim Hee-sun	Millennium Democratic	2000–2008	
2004	Kim Hee-sun	Uri	2000–2008	
2008	Chang Kwang-geun	Grand National	2008–2012	
2012	Ahn Gyu-back	Democratic United	2012–present	Secretary General of the Democratic Party (2016–2017); Minister of National Defense (2025–)
2016	Ahn Gyu-back	Democratic	2012–present	Secretary General of the Democratic Party (2016–2017); Minister of National Defense (2025–)
2020	Ahn Gyu-back	Democratic	2012–present	Secretary General of the Democratic Party (2016–2017); Minister of National Defense (2025–)
2024	Ahn Gyu-back	Democratic	2012–present	Secretary General of the Democratic Party (2016–2017); Minister of National Defense (2025–)

== Election results ==
=== 2024 ===
Legislative Election 2024: Dongdaemun A
Party	Candidate	Votes	%	±%
Democratic	Ahn Gyu-back	53,978	52.89	▲0.17
People Power	Kim Young-woo	45,377	44.46	▲2.66
Reform	Han Seung-min	2,689	2.63	new
Rejected ballots		1,488	–	
Turnout		103,532	68.17	▲1.68
Registered electors		151,861		
Democratic hold		Swing		

=== 2020 ===
Legislative Election 2020: Dongdaemun A
Party	Candidate	Votes	%	±%
Democratic	Ahn Gyu-back	51,551	52.7	+9.9
United Future	Heo Yong-beom	40,874	41.8	+3.5
Independent	Lee Ga-hyeon	2,009	2.1	new
Minsaeng	Baek Geum-san	1,679	1.7	new
Minjung	Oh Jun-seok	1,264	1.3	new
National Revolutionary Dividends	Jeong Gong-myeong	393	0.4	new
Rejected ballots		1,257	–	–
Turnout		99,027	66.5	+7.8
Registered electors		148,942		
Democratic hold				

=== 2016 ===
Legislative Election 2016: Dongdaemun A
Party	Candidate	Votes	%	±%
Democratic	Ahn Gyu-baek	39,728	42.8	−5.6
Saenuri	Heo Yong-beom	35,593	38.3	−7.2
People	Kim Yoon	14,674	15.8	new
Justice	Oh Jeong-bin	2,911	3.1	new
Rejected ballots		1,148	–	–
Turnout		94,054	58.7	+5.6
Registered electors		160,115		
Democratic hold		Swing		

=== 2012 ===
Legislative Election 2012: Dongdaemun A
Party	Candidate	Votes	%	±%
Democratic United	Ahn Gyu-baek	41,993	48.4	+15.5
Saenuri	Heo Yong-beom	39,473	45.5	−8.0
Independent	Cho Kwang-han	4,039	4.7	new
National Thought	Yoon Ji-hyun	1,242	1.4	new
Rejected ballots		601	–	–
Turnout		87,348	53.1	+7.0
Registered electors		164,396		
Democratic United gain from Saenuri		Swing		

=== 2008 ===
Legislative Election 2008: Dongdaemun A
Party	Candidate	Votes	%	±%
Grand National	Chang Kwang-geun	39,127	53.5	+12.5
Democratic	Kim Hee-sun	24,014	32.9	new
Pro-Park Coalition	Kim Jeong-seok	4,735	6.5	new
Democratic Labor	Bang Jong-ok	3,716	5.1	+0.7
Independent	Chang Ho-gwon	1,011	1.4	new
Family Federation	Park Sang-sun	475	0.6	new
Rejected ballots		–	–	–
Turnout		73,078	46.1	−15.6
Registered electors		159,626		
Grand National gain from Democratic		Swing		

=== 2004 ===
Legislative Election 2004: Dongdaemun A
Party	Candidate	Votes	%	±%
Uri	Kim Hee-sun	43,228	44.1	+0.6
Grand National	Chang Kwang-geun	40,210	41.0	+5.1
Millennium Democratic	Ji Yong-ho	6,136	6.3	−37.2
Democratic Labor	Kim Young-joon	4,310	4.4	new
Independent	Han Seung-min	2,444	2.5	−33.4
Independent	Lee Kyung-hee	934	1.0	new
United Liberal Democrats	Kim Young-hwan	804	0.8	−10.7
Rejected ballots		840	–	–
Turnout		98,906	61.7	+7.4
Registered electors		160,431		
Uri gain from Millennium Democratic		Swing		

=== 2000 ===
Legislative Election 2000: Dongdaemun A
Party	Candidate	Votes	%	±%
Millennium Democratic	Kim Hee-sun	32,971	43.5	+9.6
Grand National	Han Seung-min	27,213	35.9	−2.2
United Liberal Democrats	Roh Seung-woo	8,751	11.5	+0.1
Democratic People's	Sim Yang-seop	4,131	5.5	new
Youth Progressive	Kim Sook-yi	2,794	3.7	new
Rejected ballots		762	–	–
Turnout		76,622	54.3	−4.7
Registered electors		143,649		
Millennium Democratic gain from Grand National		Swing		

=== 1996 ===
Legislative Election 1996: Dongdaemun A
Party	Candidate	Votes	%	±%
New Korea	Roh Seung-woo	34,120	38.1	+6.7
National Congress	Kim Hee-sun	30,392	33.9	new
United Liberal Democrats	Son Yoon-joon	10,207	11.4	new
Democratic	Chang Kwang-geun	10,065	11.2	−19.4
Independent	Lee Geun-gyu	4,794	5.4	new
Rejected ballots		1,695	–	–
Turnout		91,273	59.0	−8.8
Registered electors		154,807		
New Korea hold		Swing		

=== 1992 ===
Legislative Election 1992: Dongdaemun A
Party	Candidate	Votes	%	±%
Democratic Liberal	Roh Seung-woo	35,587	31.4	+7.7
Democratic	Choi Hoon	34,710	30.6	+5.5
Reunification National	Yoo Jong-yeol	25,486	22.5	new
Independent	Yun Yong	12,489	11.0	new
New Political Reform	Song Cha-gap	2,188	1.9	new
Independent	Moon Seung-gook	1,564	1.4	new
Independent	Kwak Byeong-gi	1,002	0.9	new
Gongmyeong Democratic	Jeong Jae-bok	301	0.3	new
Rejected ballots		1,187	–	–
Turnout		114,514	67.8	−3.0
Registered electors		168,961		
Democratic Liberal gain from Democratic		Swing		

=== 1988 ===
Legislative Election 1988: Dongdaemun A
Party	Candidate	Votes	%	±%
Peace Democratic	Choi Hoon	28,475	25.1	new
Democratic Justice	Yoo Jong-yeol	26,900	23.7	new
Reunification Democratic	Roh Seung-woo	26,716	23.6	new
New Democratic Republican	Lee In-geun	24,442	21.6	new
One National Democratic	Chang Kwang-geun	4,348	3.8	new
Independent	Kang Doo-won	1,878	1.7	new
Our Justice	Jeon Myung-hwan	594	0.5	new
Rejected ballots		1,052	–	–
Turnout		114,405	70.8	–
Registered electors		161,528		

== See also ==
- List of constituencies of the National Assembly of South Korea
