= 光漢 =

光漢 is an Asian given name meaning "light, man". It may refer to:

- Liu Shipei (1884–1919), Chinese philologist who took his name Guang Han (光漢)
- Cho Kwang-han (조광한; Hanja: 趙光漢; born 1958), South Korean politician
- Greg Han (許光漢; born 1990), Taiwanese actor and singer
- Sin Kwanghan (신광한; 申光漢) (1484-1555), Korean politician Sin Sukchu's grandson
- Wu Guanghan (吳光漢), Chinese civil engineer, Li Ming (banker)’s nephew
