= Kim Eun-kyung (commercial law professor) =

South Korean law academic (born 1965)

- 김은경

Senior Deputy Governor of Financial Supervisory Service
- Incumbent
- Assumed office 9 March 2020
- President: Moon Jae-in
- Prime Minister: Chung Sye-kyun

Personal details
- Born: 7 June 1965 (age 61)
- Education: Hankuk University of Foreign Studies; University of Mannheim

Korean name
- Hangul: 김은경
- RR: Gim Eungyeong
- MR: Kim Ŭn'gyŏng

Kim Eun-kyung (Korean: 김은경; born 7 June 1965) is a South Korean professor of commercial law at Hankuk University of Foreign Studies currently serving as the Senior Deputy Governor of Financial Supervisory Service - the first woman to assume its post since FSS was established in 1999. As one of three Senior Deputy Governors, she is managing its Consumer Finance and Protection Bureau.

She is reportedly regarded as an expert on consumer protection and insurance and took various roles in Financial Supervisory Service and Financial Services Commission. She served as a board member of Korea Legal Aid Corporation and Traffic Accident Compensation Supervisory Service. Moreover, she was a member of Presidential Commission of Policy Planning.

Kim holds three degrees in law - bachelor's and master's from Hankuk University of Foreign Studies and doctorate from University of Mannheim. She has been teaching at her alma mater's law school from 2006.
