= Além do Guarda-Roupa =

Brazilian teen drama television series

- Promotional poster
- Genre: Comedy Teen drama Fantasy Romance Music
- Created by: List: Andréa Midori; Alice Andreoli Hidrata; Gabriel Jubé; Letícia Kamiguchi; Pedro Pena; Palas; Mariana Suzuki; Marina Esodrevo
- Directed by: Marcelo Trotta; Paula Kim; Sabrina Greve
- Starring: Sharon Cho; Kim Woojin; Kim Jin-kwon; Lee Min-wook; Yoon Jae-chan; Júlia Rabello
- Country of origin: Brazil
- Original languages: Portuguese; Korean
- No. of seasons: 1
- No. of episodes: 10

Production
- Production company: Coração da Selva

Original release
- Network: HBO Max
- Release: 20 July – 9 August 2023

Além do Guarda-Roupa (English: My Magic Closet; Korean: 옷장 너머로) is a Brazilian television series directed by Marcelo Trotta, Sabrina Greve and Paula Kim for HBO Max. The series features Sharon Cho, Kim Woojin, Kim Jin-kwon, Lee Min-wook, Yoon Jae-chan, Júlia Rabello, Sabrina Nonata, Lucas Deluti, Luiza Parente, Gabriel Coppola, Pyong Lee and Ana Botafogo in the main cast.

== Plot ==
Carol, is a 17-year-old teenager, daughter of a Brazilian dancer and a South Korean, who lives a challenging journey of overcoming, acceptance and self-knowledge after the death of her mother and the abandonment of her father, who decides to return to South Korea. In a conflicting relationship with her ancestry, she denies knowing any subject that refers to South Korean culture, but her life changes after a unique discovery: her wardrobe is actually a magical portal that connects her room to the dormitory of the world's most popular and successful K-pop boy group, ACT (Korean: 에스티; RR: Eseuti). Through adventures, she faces challenges in love, friendships and her roots.

== Cast ==
- Sharon Cho as Carol (Korean: 캐롤; RR: Kaelol), a South Korean-Brazilian teenager who dreams of being a ballerina but struggles to connect with her Korean heritage.
- Sabrina Nonata as Nayara, Carol's best friend and the No. 1 fan of ACT, the most famous South Korean K-pop boy group.
- Kim Woojin as Kyung-min (Korean: 경민; RR: Gyeong-min), a South Korean K-pop idol who is the bad boy leader of ACT, the most famous South Korean K-pop boy group and one of Carol's love interests.
- Kim Jin-kwon as Dae-ho (Korean: 대호; RR: Dae-ho), ACT's vocalist and main dancer and Carol's other love interest (along with his groupmate Kyung-min).
- Lee Min-wook as Sang-mok (Korean: 상목; RR: Sang-mog), ACT's hot-headed main vocalist.
- Yoon Jae-chan as Chul-woo (Korean: 철우; RR: Cheol-u), ACT's main rapper and maknae (youngest member)
- Pyong Lee as JP (Korean: 종필), ACT's strict manager, who does everything to keep the members of the group in line to avoid any kind of scandal.
- Júlia Rabello as Rebeca, Carol's aunt and boss. She owns a K-pop themed cafe (a popular ACT-themed cafe) in Bom Retiro (a neighborhood in São Paulo famous for being Brazil's main Koreatown) and has a turbulent relationship with her niece.

== Original soundtrack ==
Além do Guarda-Roupa (Trilha Sonora da Série Original HBO Max)

Soundtrack album / EP by Kim Woojin, Jinkwon, Lee Min Wook, and Yoon Jae Chan (Note: Credited to in-universe boy band ACT)
- Released: August 10, 2023
- Length: 9:15
- Label: WaterTower
- Producer: Felipe Vassão

Kim Woojin chronology
The Moment: A Minor (2021)	Além do Guarda-Roupa (2023)	The Moment: Bounce (2023)

Além do Guarda-Roupa (Trilha Sonora da Série Original HBO Max) (English: My Magic Closet (HBO Max Original Series Soundtrack)) is the accompanying soundtrack EP for the series. It was released on August 10, 2023 by WatchTower Records. The soundtrack EP features three songs performed in the series by fictional boygroup ACT. The four actors that portrayed the members of ACT, Kim Woojin, Jinkwon, Lee Min Wook, and Yoon Jae Chan, contributed their vocals to the EP.

A music video for "Vroom" was released onto HBO Max Brazil's official YouTube channel on July 17. The video features the four singers appearing in their capacity as members of the show's in-universe boy band.

=== Track listing ===
All tracks performed by Kim Woojin, Jinkwon, Lee Min Wook, Yoon Jae Chan in their roles as fictional in-universe boy band ACT. All music is composed by Felipe Vassão.

No.	Title	Writer(s)	Length
1.	"Vroom"	CJ ENM Co.	3:22
2.	"Worlds Apart"	Ashley Alisha; Felipe Vassão	2:55
3.	"Time Bomb"	Felipe Vassão	2:56
Total length:			9:15
