= Ahn Gyu-back =

South Korean politician

- 안규백
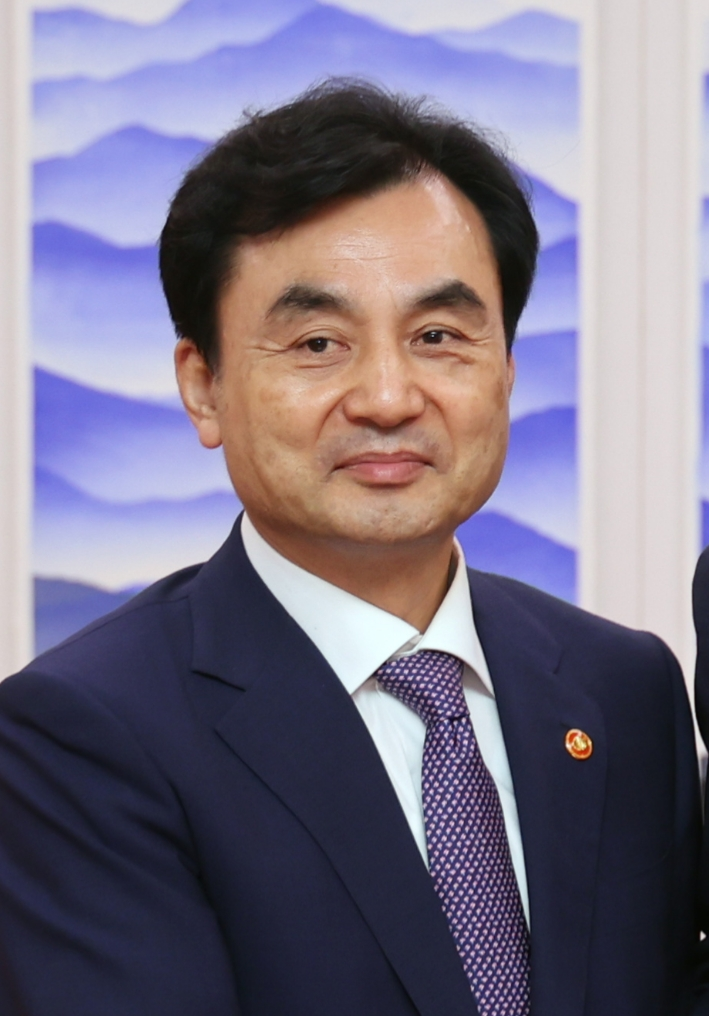
- Ahn in 2025

Minister of National Defense
- In office 25 July 2025 – 22 September 2026
- President: Lee Jae Myung
- Prime Minister: Kim Min-seok; Han Seong-sook
- Preceded by: Kim Yong-hyun; Lee Doo-hee (acting)
- Succeeded by: Kang Shin-chul

Member of the National Assembly
- Incumbent
- Assumed office 30 May 2012
- Preceded by: Chang Kwang-keun
- Constituency: Seoul Dongdaemun A
- In office 30 May 2008 – 29 May 2012
- Constituency: Proportional representation

Personal details
- Born: 29 April 1961 (age 65) Gochang, South Korea
- Citizenship: South Korean
- Party: Democratic
- Education: Sungkyunkwan University
- Website: safe100.or.kr

Korean name
- Hangul: 안규백
- Hanja: 安圭伯
- RR: An Gyubaek
- MR: An Kyubaek

Ahn Gyu-back (Korean: 안규백; born 29 April 1961) is a South Korean politician who has served as the Minister of national defense from 2025 to 2026. A Member of the Democratic Party of Korea (DPK), he has been a Member of the National Assembly for Dongdaemun District A, Seoul, since 2012, and previously served as a party list member from 2008 to 2012. Ahn is the first civilian defense minister in 64 years and the fifth civilian defense minister since 1948.

== Early life and education ==
Born in Gochang County in North Jeolla, He graduated from elementary and middle school in Gochang, and attended high school in Gwangju, and studied Eastern philosophy at Sungkyunkwan University as an undergraduate before earning a master's degree at the university's Department of Commerce and Trade.

== Career ==
Ahn was appointed deputy floor leader of the New Politics Alliance for Democracy, the Minjoo Party's predecessor, on 12 October 2014, and remained in that position for seven months. He was praised by his Saenuri Party counterpart, Cho Hae-jin, who described him as having an "honest and upright" character and "always thinking of his country first". (Note: "안 의원을 추천한 조해진 새누리당 의원은 그에 대해 '성품이 정직하고 바르며 언제나 나라를 먼저 생각한다'고 이유를 설명했다.") He subsequently became head of strategy and public relations for the NPAD on 23 June 2015.

A ranking member of the Assembly's National Defense Committee, Ahn has been a critic of South Korea's defense policy. In 2011 he stated that draft-dodging had doubled under the Lee Myung-bak administration, and at the end of 2015 he attacked Park Geun-hye's government for signing an intelligence cooperation agreement with Japan and the United States, stating that "it is against all reason to give [Korea's] advanced information" to Japan given its colonial history in the peninsula and continuing territorial claims over the Liancourt Rocks. In June 2015, he introduced a bill to honor the veterans of the Second Battle of Yeonpyeong, an armed confrontation with North Korea that had taken place in 2002.

On 23 June 2025, President Lee Jae Myung nominated Ahn as defense minister, making him the first person not to have previously served as a general to be chosen for the position since 1961, and the fifth person not to have previously served as a general to be chosen for the position since 1948. Ahn's scrutiny hearing in the South Korean National Assembly was held on 15 July 2025.

== Electoral history ==
Election	Year	District	Party affiliation	Votes	Percentage of votes	Results
18th National Assembly General Election	2008	Proportional Representation (14th)	United Democratic Party	4,313,645	25.17%	Elected
19th National Assembly General Election	2012	Seoul Dongdaemun A	Democratic United Party	41,933	48.41%	Won
20th National Assembly General Election	2016	Seoul Dongdaemun A	Democratic Party	39,728	42.76%	Won
21st National Assembly General Election	2020	Seoul Dongdaemun A	Democratic Party	51,551	52.72%	Won
22nd National Assembly General Election	2024	Seoul Dongdaemun A	Democratic Party	53,978	52.89%	Won
