= Kreation Music Rights =

South Korean music publishing company

- Type: Subsidiary
- Industry: Music
- Predecessor: SM Friends
- Founded: September 2023; 3 years ago
- Headquarters: South Korea
- Key people: Heo Young-ah (CEO)
- Services: Music publishing
- Parent: SM Entertainment
- Website: kreation.co.kr

Kreation Music Rights is a South Korean music publishing company and a subsidiary of SM Entertainment. It was launched in 2023 as part of the company's SM 3.0 strategy. As of April 2025, KMR has recruited over 200 songwriters, making it the largest company of its kind in the K-pop industry.

== History ==
In August 2023, SM Entertainment CEO Jang Cheol-hyuk announced plans during an investor presentation to launch a new music publishing company called Kreation Music Rights (KMR), as part of the SM 3.0 strategy. SM converted the existing SM Friends subsidiary into a music publishing label to support SM's newly established multi-production center system, providing a wider pool of songs for artists. It was also intended to provide an additional revenue stream for the company, enabling the internalization of royalties and music sales to other companies. KMR was launched in September 2023, with investment of 27.1 billion won. Lee Sung-soo, SM's chief A&R officer and longtime head of production, was appointed CEO.

KMR established a European office in Stockholm in December 2023. Writers signed to the company include Norwegian songwriting team Dsign Music, responsible for songs such as Girls' Generation's "Genie", NCT Dream's "ISTJ" and Taemin's "Want", and Sweden-based duo Sunshine, responsible for Red Velvet's "Psycho" and Aespa's "Spicy". KMR also acquired the South Korean production teams MonoTree and The Hub, joining the Kangta-led Smash Hit as CICs (company-in-company). It has plans to establish a North American subsidiary and form additional partnerships with local companies. KMR attracted controversy over its acquisition of The Hub and entertainment company 10x Entertainment, with allegations that it overpaid for the two companies. SM refuted this, explaining that The Hub showed rapid sales growth and 10x was part of its plan to establish a label. In March 2024, KMR launched the production label Kustomade, representing former Stray Kids member Kim Woo-jin and Yelo, a member of MonoTree. It signed business agreements with several educational institutions to foster new talent in the field of K-pop production, including Dong-ah Institute of Media and Arts and Howon University. In September 2024, Kangta said that SM had released around 170 songs through KMR since its establishment, and that it was saving them up to 60 billion won per year in copyright and publishing fees.

KMR signed sub-publishing deals with Swedish label TEN Music Group, which houses artists such as Icona Pop and Omar Rudberg, and Japanese publisher Soundgraphics. In April 2025, it appointed Heo Young-ah as its new CEO to assist with the global market. Heo has over 25 years of industry experience, having previously worked at Sony Music Publishing Korea, the Korea Music Copyright Association, Netflix and the Walt Disney Company Korea.

== Labels ==
Company-in-company

- MonoTree
- The Hub
- Smash Hit
- BadX

Production labels

- Kustomade

== Artists ==
=== Kustomade ===
- Kim Woojin
- Yelo
