= Lee Sung-soo =

South Korean businessman (born 1979)

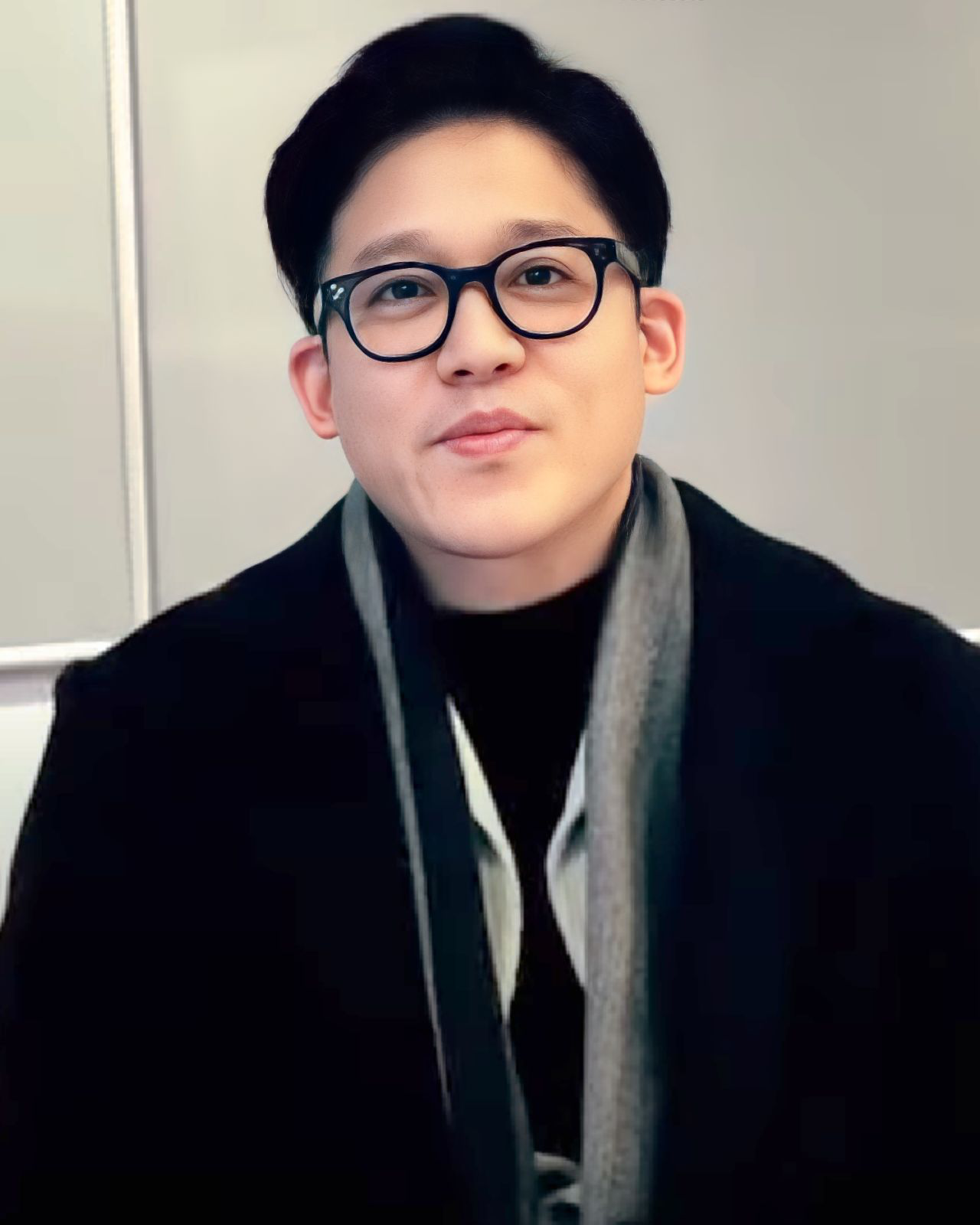
- Lee in 2017
- Born: November 3, 1979 (age 47)
- Other name: Chris Lee
- Education: Hankuk University of Foreign Studies
- Years active: 1998–present
- Title: CAO of SM Entertainment
- Relatives: Lee Soo-man (uncle)

Korean name
- Hangul: 이성수
- RR: I Seongsu
- MR: I Sŏngsu

Lee Sung-soo (Korean: 이성수; also spelled Lee Sung-su; born November 3, 1979) is a South Korean music production director and Artists and repertoire (A&R) executive. He is the chief A&R officer of SM Entertainment. He was formerly the CEO of SM Entertainment and SM Entertainment USA. Lee began working for SM as early as 1998 as a part-timer and officially joined the agency in 2005 as an A&R representative, before later becoming head of the production division.

Lee is an expert in the field of music production and is considered one of the key figures who has led the growth of SM. A member of the company's core organization of A&R, he has been responsible for the songs and concepts of SM artists such as BoA, Girls' Generation, Shinee, f(x), Exo, Red Velvet, and NCT. He is also known for introducing the idea of the songwriting camp to the K-pop industry.

== Life and career ==
Born on November 3, 1979, Lee Sung-soo graduated from the Department of International Trade at Hankuk University of Foreign Studies. He is the nephew of SM founder Lee Soo-man's late wife. Lee began working for SM Entertainment as early as 1998 while attending university as a part-timer focused on various tasks, such as identifying fan club trends. He developed an interest in A&R and attended the SM Academy, where he studied computer composition and arrangement, stating that he should "know how to make music to be good at A&R". He officially joined SM in 2005 as a member of the A&R department and worked with Chinese singer Zhang Liyin as his first project. The first group he worked with was Shinee, whom he wrote two songs for: "Romeo and Juliette" and "The Name I Loved". He became head of the A&R department in 2009 and head of the production division in 2015, directly under Lee Soo-man. By that point, he was directing 80 percent of artist production. Lee worked with numerous artists, including BoA, Girls' Generation, Exo, Red Velvet, and NCT, but his influence was most clearly felt in the work of Shinee and f(x), whose "unique" style stood in opposition to the intense, performance-driven music championed by Yoo Young-jin, SM's music director.

In 2013, Lee introduced the idea of the songwriting camp to the K-pop industry. He had first started teaming up with foreign composers in the early 2000s, but initially found it difficult due to the low profile of K-pop at the time. Following the release of several hit songs by SM artists in 2009, he began to be invited to songwriting camps hosted by foreign music publishers, and brought the idea back to South Korea. Over the years, he identified talented composers and compiled them into a list, and within SM, they formed a studio that could operate a songwriting camp all year round. Lee stayed abroad for a third of the year and formed a "strong" network of foreign composers, hosting songwriting camps for SM with them and the company's in-house composers. This system was eventually adopted by other K-pop companies. He was also responsible for the creation of SM Station and SM Classics.

Lee was appointed a registered director in 2017 and became CEO of SM Entertainment USA in 2019. On March 10, 2020, SM announced through the board of directors that Lee Sung-soo, general director of music production, and Tak Young-jun, general director of artist management, had been appointed co-CEOs of the company. Through the announcement of the company's appointment of two new executives, Lee was appointed as the chief executive officer (CEO), with Tak as the chief marketing officer (CMO), as SM celebrated its 25th year.

In 2023, Lee and Tak became embroiled in a dispute over SM's management rights with founder Lee Soo-man. After being pushed out of the company due to shareholder outrage over high producing fees, Lee Soo-man sold his shares to Hybe Corporation, making them the largest shareholder. Lee and Tak, who had been planning to restructure the company, allied themselves with technology company Kakao in an effort to guarantee SM's independence. On March 12, Hybe withdrew from the takeover battle, ceding control of SM's management rights to Kakao. Lee announced his intention to stand down as CEO and return to his role in A&R. His term came to an end on March 31. He was appointed the chief A&R officer (CAO) and is leading the A&R Committee following SM's reorganisation. He was also appointed CEO of Kreation Music Rights, a newly-created subsidiary that focuses on music publishing.

== Keynote speeches ==
List of Lee Sung-soo keynote speeches
Event	Date	City	Venue	Theme	Ref.
2014 Hallyu Trends and Prospects	January 20, 2014	Seoul	Korea Press Center	Production and Cultural Technology that Led to the Success of K-pop	
International Hallyu Workshop: Content Innovation for Korean Wave 3.0	August 2, 2014	Busan	—N/a	Production Technology and Internationalization	
K-Factor: An Orchestral Exploration of K-pop	June 19, 2019 (Note: The K-Factor: An Orchestral Exploration of K-pop was held on June 20, 2019, at Alice Tully Hall in Lincoln Center, where a 50-piece orchestra from the Juilliard School reinterpreted K-pop to a classical performance. The "special lecture" was held a day before the event, with Lee Sung-soo as a "special speaker".)	New York City	David Rubenstein Atrium	The True Value of K-pop	
2019 Content Industry Forum	June 25, 2019 (Note: The 2019 Content Industry Forum was held from June 18 to 20 and 25 to 27, 2019, with Lee having his story forum only on June 25.)	Seoul	CKL Stage	Idol Worldview Strategy	
Day of Action	September 7, 2019	Seoul	Starfield Library	Dreaming Together: The Future of K-pop and Culture Technology	
Digital New Deal Cultural Content Industry	September 24, 2020	Gimpo	Camp One	Examples of Online Non-face-to-face K-pop Performances	
Mu:Con Online 2020 (Note: also called as 2020 Seoul International Music Fair)	September 25, 2020 (Note: The Mu:Con Online 2020 was held from September 23 to 26, 2020, with Lee giving his keynote speech only on September 25.)	—N/a		Culture Technology, IP Industry and Untact	
Korea Investment Festival (KIF) 2020	October 7, 2020 (Note: The Korea Investment Festival (KIF) 2020 was held from October 6 to 7, 2020, with Lee giving his presentation on the afternoon of October 7.)	Seoul	Conrad Hotel	The Future Strategy of K-pop in the Post-Corona Era	
ComeUp 2020	November 21, 2020 (Note: The ComeUp 2020 was held from November 19 to 21, 2020, with Lee delivering his keynote lecture on November 21.)	Goyang	CJ ENM Ilsan Production Center	Culture Technology, Shining in the Untact Era	
2nd World Culture Industry Forum (WCIF)	July 1, 2021	—N/a		Combination of the Virtual and Real Worlds and Changes in the Entertainment Industry (Note: Lee Soo-man gave the keynote speech at the conference with the theme: Future Technology Change and Vision of the K-pop Industry, with Lee Sung-soo only attending the forum's second session as a panelist.)	
2021 StartUp:Con	October 7, 2021	—N/a		SM Content Roadmap - Future Content Era with SMCU	
2022 Content Industry Forum	April 27, 2022 (Note: The 2022 Content Industry Forum was held from April 26 to 28, 2022, with Lee giving his keynote speech on April 27.)	—N/a		World to Communicate with SMCU (SM Culture Universe)	
3rd World Culture Industry Forum (WCIF)	July 6, 2022 (Note: The 3rd World Culture Industry Forum was held from July 6 to 7, 2022, with Lee giving his keynote speech on July 6.)	Daegu	Hotel Susung Convention Hall	The Age of Metaverse: The Music and Entertainment Industry	
"—" denotes events where its venue was not publicized or was held online.

== Filmography ==
List of documentary title, year released, and role
Year	Title	Role	Ref.
2022	K-pop Generation	Himself	

== Accolades ==
=== Awards and nominations ===
Name of the award ceremony, year presented, category, nominee(s) of the award, and the result of the nomination
Award ceremony	Year	Category	Nominee(s)	Result	Ref.
Korea Creative Management	2019	Job Creation	Lee Sung-soo (Note: as CEO of SM Entertainment; alongside Lee Soo-man)	Won	
Korea Creative Management	2020	Job Creation	Lee Sung-soo	Won	

=== Listicles ===
Name of publisher, year listed, name of listicle, and placement
Publisher	Year	Listicle	Placement	Ref.
Billboard	2022	Indie Power Players	Placed	
Billboard	2022	International Power Players	Placed	
Billboard	2023	International Power Players	Placed	
