= SM 3.0 =

SM Entertainment business and development system

SM 3.0 is the latest business strategy and development plan of the South Korean entertainment company SM Entertainment. Announced in February 2023, it would focus on integrating various aspects of the company's operations, including music production, content creation, and global distribution, into a cohesive system. The plan would aim to expand the company's market presence and enhance its offerings to provide a more comprehensive experience for fans. The implementation of SM 3.0 would involve the development of an intellectual property (IP), business, overseas, and investment system, as well as a multi-production center and label system. These systems were designed to support the company's efforts to optimize its operations and increase its competitiveness in the entertainment industry, particularly in terms of producing content and expanding its market reach.

== History ==
With the "success" of H.O.T., who debuted in 1996, SM Entertainment became a "pioneer" in the genre of K-pop, led by the company's founder Lee Soo-man, and considered SM 1.0 until 2010, when artists such as H.O.T., BoA, TVXQ, Super Junior, Girls' Generation, and Shinee debuted. Until 2022, Lee made a significant contribution to SM as an executive producer through a contract with the company and created Exo, Red Velvet, NCT, and Aespa, with the company having several people with producing capabilities was described as SM 2.0. Throughout that particular generation, the system was under the governance of the company's general manager Kim Young-min. Additionally, Tak Young-jun stated that during the SM 1.0 and 2.0 systems, SM produced intellectual property (IP) of its artists under the sole leadership of the company's chief producer Lee. The start of SM 3.0 was announced on February 3, 2023.

== Development ==
"… the talented successors will manage the business very well with ease, as the line-up of SM artists for concerts and activities in the global market is now fully prepared and the production system, built over 25 years, is being well managed. As a major shareholder, I humbly accede to the request of minority shareholders to retire… hope the board members of SM Entertainment will establish a strategy for the next 50 years to become a global entertainment company"

— Lee Soo-man, Founder of SM Entertainment, on succession and advancement of SM legacy.

In September 2022, Lee Soo-man stepped down from the company and only became a major shareholder of SM Entertainment because of the sentiments expressed by the minority shareholders for him to retire. On February 3, 2023, SM announced the SM 3.0: IP Strategy - Multi 'Production Center/Label' System through its official YouTube channel and homepage. The "strategic" vision of SM 3.0 was considered a "practical" plan for SM, which had declared to enhance shareholder value and improve governance after it terminated the production contract with Lee and commenced a reorganization of the members of the board of directors. SM 3.0 would be promoted based on the intellectual property (IP), business, overseas, and investment system, which would be the future growth engine of the company. The four strategies are detailed as follows:

1. Production of "high-quality" IP, which is SM's entertainment business core;
2. Business monetization through IP;
3. Expansion of IP beyond the local market and internationally;
4. Based on the financial performance monetized through IP, investing in new businesses such as global music publishing business, label acquisition, fandom economy business, and the metaverse.

SM also introduced a multi-production center or label system for producing "new, mega" IP crucial for SM 3.0 and will be promoted around the establishment of a multi-production center, multi-label, and music publishing subsidiary. This system in SM 3.0 would maintain the existing accumulated IP production and operation know-how, expand production capabilities, and entrust business decision-making authority to each director through "subjective" artist management to improve IP production quality, being a system that can accelerate the speed and advance the SM standard. Lee Sung-soo stated that SM's existing system had limitations in IP production and operation required by the market and fans and pointed out the meaning of introducing a multi-production center and multi-label. Lee added that by "dispersing and systematizing" multiple production centers and labels, the company could secure its business sustainability in a "competitive" way. The system would produce several entities by way of their respective IPs, and through this, [it would purposely]:

- Secure business sustainability through capacity distribution and systematization;
- Strengthen IP creation by guaranteeing independent decision-making;
- Expand music diversity through respect for autonomy;
- Establish a foundation for "long-term" mutual growth between artists and companies.

Accordingly, SM divided SM artists into "five plus one" (5+1) production centers, where five of the centers would guarantee "independent" decision-making by arranging artist-only production and "essential" functions and show off "improved" IP creation by respecting "creative" autonomy. Additionally, a virtual artist or IP production center would be dedicated to the production and operation management of virtual artists, such as s, to continue its "leading" position in the future entertainment industry represented by the metaverse. The production centers would grow into an in-house label, supporting label independence for artists with "established" musical or business originality, providing independence and opportunities for growth simultaneously, and a reward structure based on performance. SM would also establish a 100% invested music publishing subsidiary to ensure that "high-quality" music would be "evenly" delivered to each production center and label and build an extensive music pool. By signing contracts with composers, lyricists, and international music publishing companies, it planned to grow into another new source of revenue for SM by fostering it as a "unique, global" music publishing company.

In the multi-production center, a separate music selection council called the Artists and Repertoire (A&R) Committee would be created to help produce "quality" music that would fulfill SM's standards. The committee is a consultative body composed of A&R managers from each production center and professionals from organizations under the A&R Headquarters. It would maintain the SM music standard through the joint intelligence of music experts. An IP Committee would also be established separately from the production center to discuss management with its main agenda for concept planning of new artists, which is the phase before being assigned to the production center or label independence for mature artists. The consultative body would consist of production center leaders, a chief financial officer (CFO), and a consulting group composed of "specialized" external organizations, prioritizing IP planning and operation and understanding the market and fans rather than a few company executives and employees.

External videos
- SM 3.0: Producing Strategy - Multi 'Production Center/Label' System

SM announced it would launch three new groups and a virtual solo artist in 2023, with plans to debut a new girl group in the first quarter, a virtual artist in the second quarter, NCT Tokyo in the third quarter, and a new boy group in the fourth quarter. Lee Sung-soo, Tak Young-jun, and inside director Park Joon-young will each lead the debut project. The company is also anticipated to release more than 40 albums, a 30% increase compared to 2022, and record sales of more than 18 million copies. Furthermore, the company would expand its musical spectrum and strengthen its musical influence by acquiring labels of various genres that SM does not focus on, such as ballad, R&B, and hip-hop. SM also predicted that it would be possible for more than two groups to debut in a year instead of just one group debuting every three-point-five years.

The company has delayed the majority of its debuts planned for 2023. On May 24, 2023, SM released a video titled "SM 3.0: NEW IP 2023" on their official YouTube Channel, in which the CEO Jang Chul-hyuck announced the company's plans for the year. This includes the creation of a new NCT sub-unit consisting of 2 new trainees of Japanese and Korean nationalities, marking an end to the group's limitless concept. On July 31, 2023, the company that a boy group named 'Riize,' consisting of former NCT members Sungchan and Shotaro were set to debut for early September.

On August 2, 2023, SM published its sales and operating profit data for the 2nd quarter of 2023. It reported that total sales increased by 30% compared to the same quarter in 2022, while operating profit increased 84%. The company also reported that a new girl group and virtual IP 'Naevis' are planned to debut in the first half of 2024.

== Production Center ==
As one of main plan of SM 3.0 to diversify artist management with multiple production centers instead of being managed by a single individual production team, previously led by Lee Soo-man, SM officially announced their 'Production Center' through their earnings release in the second quarter of 2023, which seen the label divide their artists into six production centers as;

Center	Production manager(s)	Artist(s)
Center 1 (One Production)	Choi Sung-woo; Jo Woo-cheol	Girls' Generation; Aespa
Center 2 (Prism Production)	Bang Jin-wook; Kim Wook	Shinee; WayV; Hearts2Hearts
Center 3 (Red Production)	Kim Joo-young; Kwon Yun-jung	TVXQ; Red Velvet
Center 4 (Neo Production)	Kang Byung-jun; Chae Jung-hee	NCT
Center 5 (Wizard Production)	Kim Hyeong-guk; Lee Sang-min	Kangta; Super Junior; Exo; Riize
Virtual IP	Park Jun-young	Naevis

== Reception ==
=== Criticisms and internal strife ===
On February 6, 2023, it was reported that singer and actor Kim Min-jong, who worked for SM Entertainment for 17 years, sent an email to all SM employees on February 5 criticizing the company's announcement of SM 3.0, with the primary goal of ending Lee Soo-man's production. In the entire email, he appealed that the executives, staff, and artists were "shocked" by the announcement of the two co-CEOs and that the statement was not the result of communicating with Lee but an "arbitrary" decision. Kim claimed that contrary to what was announced, Lee Sung-soo and Tak Young-jun, who remarked that they were for Lee Soo-man and the SM family," cut off all contact with the Lee Soo-man and made "one-sided" announcements and farewells without any discussions with the insiders. It was believed that Kim must have felt "betrayed" by the two representatives who had been with Lee for a long time and insisted that Lee's senses were needed for SM and had Lee's life to the company's founding and development should be treated with respect. Following Kim's email, he faced a backlash after criticizing SM's co-CEO over Lee's resignation, and employees at SM expressed their sentiments in favor of the company's production reorganization plan anonymously.

=== Stock price increase ===
The public, industry, and market reactions to SM 3.0 are favorable as it incorporates modifications to improve the efficiency of SM's organizations, including multi-production centers and label systems. With the transition to this new system, expectations were "high" that the organization's "efficient" response to changes in the global music environment would generate results. This system was one of the governance improvement plans agreed upon between SM and Align Partners. SM stock price surpassed 90,000 won for the first time since its listing on the Korea Exchange and is expected to rise "continuously". The improvements in governance structure, "shareholder-friendly" moves, earnings growth based on new growth strategies expectations, and an end with Like Planning contract drove stock prices up.
