= Cho Kwang-han =

South Korean politician (born 1958)

- 조광한
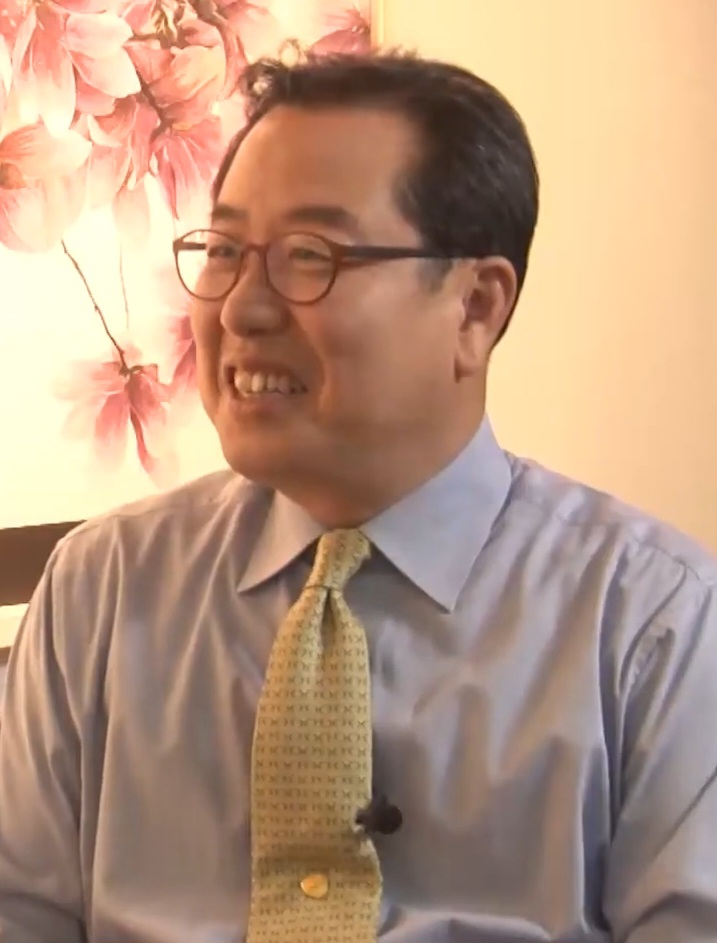

Mayor of Namyangju
- In office 1 July 2018 – 30 June 2022
- Preceded by: Lee Suk-woo
- Succeeded by: Ju Gwang-deok

Personal details
- Born: 1 February 1958 (age 68) Gunsan, South Korea
- Party: People Power
- Education: HUFS

Cho Kwang-han (Korean: 조광한; Hanja: 趙光漢; born 1 February 1958) is a South Korean politician serving as Mayor of Namyangju in Gyeonggi Province from 2018.

== Previous political career ==
He was previously an administrator at President Kim Dae-jung's Blue House. He then worked for Kim's successor Roh Moo-hyun. He was responsible for recruiting Jagalchi Market worker for televised speech in support of then-presidential candidate Roh which hit unusually high 12.4% viewer ratings. For this he was appointed by then-president Roh as his secretary for public relations and later vice spokesperson.

In 2012 general election, he unsuccessfully ran for Seoul's constituency under the slogan "I want to make Ahn Cheol-soo the president" but as an independent candidate to benchmark Ahn's "new politics campaign" as opposed to two-party system.

== Mayor of Namyangju ==
In 2018 election, Cho became the first Democratic politician to become the Mayor of Namyangju, which was taken by main opposition party, PPP, for 16 years, defeating former deputy governor of Gyeonggi Province. He earned the party nomination defeating the former deputy mayor of the city.

In October 2018, Cho launched the task force dedicated to eradicating businesses illegally selling extremely overpriced food and charging for bench usages at illegally installed restaurants around the major lakes in the city. In July 2019 the project was completed allowing citizens to enjoy cleaner lakes freely becoming the first in such project in the country. A month later Gyeonggi Province Governor Lee Jae Myung launched similar projects.

== Education and Academia ==
Cho holds a bachelor's degree in Chinese language from Hankuk University of Foreign Studies. He previously served as a visiting scholar at Georgetown University and an endowed chair professor at Kunjang University College.

== Electoral history ==
Election	Year	Position	Party affiliation	Votes	Percentage of votes	Results
1991 Iocal Election	1991	Member of Seoul Metropolitan Council from Seoul Nowon 1st	Democratic Party	6,321	24.7%	Lost (2nd)
19th General Election	2012	Member of National Assembly from Seoul Dongdaemun A	Independent	4,039	4.65%	Lost (3rd)
7th local elections	2018	Mayor of Gyeonggi Namyangju	Democratic Party	186,730	64.39%	Won
22nd General Election	2024	Member of National Assembly from Gyeonggi Namyangju C	People Power Party	64,539	42.24%	Lost (2nd)
