= Naver Vibe =

- Original author: Naver Corporation
- Release: Naver Music: March 25, 2002; Naver Vibe: June 25, 2018 (Ended: December 31, 2026, replace with Spotify South Korea)
- Operating system: iOS; Android; Windows
- Platform: Cross-platform
- Available in: Korean
- Type: Music streaming
- License: Proprietary
- Website: Naver Vibe - ended service Spotify South Korea - replaced service

Naver Vibe (Hangul:네이버 바이브) was a music streaming service developed by Naver Corporation. The service was operated alongside Naver's other music service, Naver Music (released: March 25, 2002), until the service ended on November 1, 2020 and merged with Vibe. Naver also operates another music service under its Japanese subsidiary, Line Corporation, called Line Music. It was the fifth-largest music streaming service in South Korea.
On December 31, 2026, the Naver Vibe service ended and has been replaced by Spotify South Korea.

== Overview ==
Unlike Naver's other music service, Vibe relies on artificial intelligence to curate music, recommending songs based on the sound of the songs that users are listening to rather than what's popular on charts like Naver Music. Vibe also introduced a new payment system where users pay for the songs that they listen to rather than paying a monthly fee. It also revamped the way it compensated artists by adopting a similar payment model to that used by Spotify and Apple Music, where they are paid proportionally to the volume of their music streamed.

== See also ==
- Spotify - replaced service
- Line Music
- Melon (online music service)
