= Hyunjin (Stray Kids singer) =

South Korean rapper and singer (born 2000)

- Hyunjin in January 2026
- Born: Hwang Hyun-jin; March 20, 2000 (age 26); Seoul, South Korea
- Education: Global Cyber University; School of Performing Arts Seoul
- Occupations: Rapper; singer; dancer
- Musical career
- Genres: K-pop; hip hop; dance
- Instrument: Vocals
- Years active: 2017–present
- Label: JYP
- Member of: Stray Kids

Korean name
- Hangul: 황현진
- RR: Hwang Hyeonjin
- MR: Hwang Hyŏnjin

Hwang Hyun-jin (Korean: 황현진; born March 20, 2000), known mononymously as Hyunjin, is a South Korean rapper, dancer, and singer. He is a member of the South Korean boy band Stray Kids, formed by JYP Entertainment in 2017.

Aside from his work with Stray Kids, he has worked as a television presenter, hosting the weekly Korean music program Show! Music Core (2019–2021), and has worked as a brand ambassador for luxury brands, such as Dior, Versace, Cartier, Givenchy Beauty, and Guess.

== Early life and education ==
Hwang Hyun-jin was born on March 20, 2000, in Seoul, South Korea.

Hyunjin had no dance training prior to becoming a trainee idol. He was scouted on the street by a JYP Entertainment agent during his third year of middle school, while shopping with his mother.

He majored in practical dance at the School of Performing Arts Seoul (SOPA) and officially graduated on February 15, 2019. He took the 2019 College Scholastic Ability Test (CSAT) before attending Global Cyber University, where he studied in the Department of Practical Language.

== Career ==
=== 2017–present: Pre-debut, survival show, and Stray Kids ===
During his traineeship, in late 2017, Hyunjin appeared on the Mnet survival show Stray Kids, a contest centered on the formation of JYP Entertainment's new idol group. By the time the show premiered on October 17, Hyunjin had been a trainee for two years.

After being confirmed as part of the group's line-up, Hyunjin was credited as a lyricist for the song "4419". This track was performed alongside Bang Chan and Seungmin during the survival show as part of his effort to avoid elimination. JYP Entertainment later included all songs performed by Stray Kids during the show in their pre-debut EP titled Mixtape. He officially debuted with Stray Kids on March 25, 2018, with EP I Am Not through a debut showcase.

In 2019, Hyunjin was announced as one of the presenters of the weekly chart show Show! Music Core, alongside SF9's Chani and Gugudan's Mina, serving as co-host from February 16, 2019, to February 20, 2021 (episodes 621 through 714). In December 2019, he joined KBS's project group Bbangbbangz with Yoon Sanha, Choi Bomin, and Lee Daehwi, performing covers like GOT7's "Just Right" and Red Velvet's "Psycho" on Music Bank. He also made his acting debut in the web series A-Teen 2 with a cameo appearance in the final episode, alongside fellow Stray Kids member I.N the same year.

From February to June 2021, Hyunjin was placed on a temporary hiatus due to school bullying allegations, and resumed regular activities with the group in July. During his hiatus, he was absent from participating in the majority of Stray Kids' appearances on Kingdom: Legendary War, appearing only in their introduction round performance. He made his first reappearance by featuring in the music video for the group's release, "Mixtape: Oh," on June 26, 2021.

In August 2023, Hyunjin was featured on the remix of Troye Sivan's "Rush", alongside Pink Pantheress, providing vocals for the pre-chorus and hook. With bandmates Han and Felix, Hyunjin performed a cover of Kim Sung-jae's "As I Told You" at KBS Song Festival 2022. With Yeji of Itzy, Hyunjin performed a choreographed duet – remixing two of their popular individual dance performances – at MBC Music Festival 2023.

In July 2024, together with his bandmates, it was announced Hyunjin had renewed his group contract with JYP a year earlier than expected, extending Stray Kids' affiliation with the label.

In June 2025, a year after mentioning in an interview how much he enjoyed D4vd's music, Hyunjin collaborated with him on the track, "Always Love".

== Artistry ==
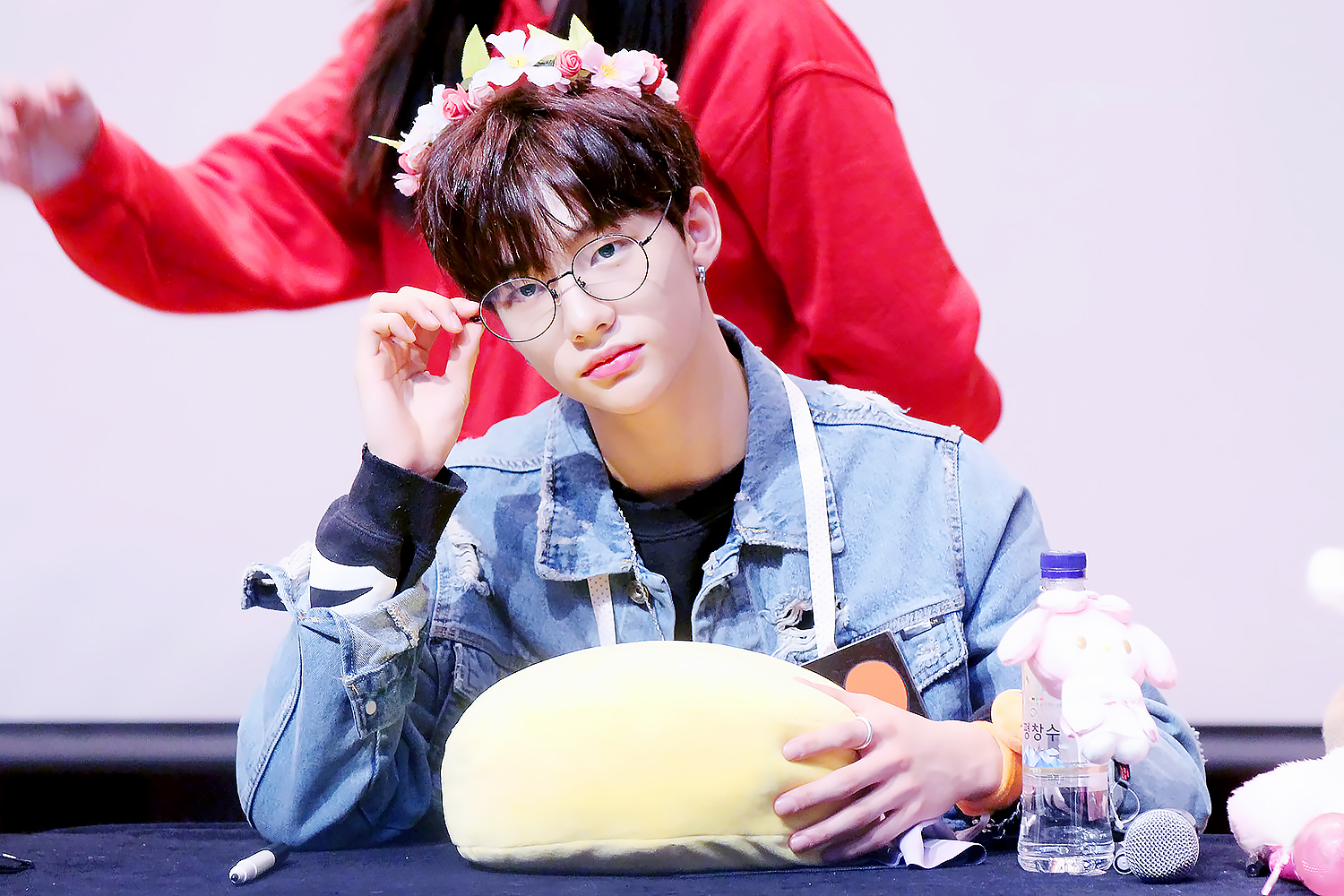
Hyunjin in January 2018

Hyunjin's dance skills have been noted for their precision and expressiveness. Additionally, Jack Lau in South China Morning Post described Hyunjin's voice as soft and soothing, demonstrating versatility beyond rapping. He is not only known for his dancing but also showcases his skills as a rapper and singer, contributing to the group's sound and performance style. In addition to his dancing and rapping skills, Hyunjin is a skilled visual artist; he has shared many of his personal paintings on social media.

=== Songwriting ===
The emotions in the lyrics I write are something only I know. In some ways, you might feel like I'm twisting my lyrics in a complicated way. I like writing lyrics that leave room for interpretation. I also get the most enjoyment from listening to someone else's music and interpreting it in my own way. So in terms of the 'style' aspect that you mentioned, I think I try to keep the melody easy-listening and the lyrics deep. I don't know how much that will be conveyed, but my songs have to be enjoyable for me to listen to.

— Hyunjin on his songwriting, Esquire Korea

Behind Stray Kids' production team, 3RACHA (bandmates Bang Chan, Changbin, and Han), Hyunjin is the fourth most accredited songwriter of the group, with 31 KOMCA credits as of March 2026. He has contributed to various B-side tracks, including four sub-unit songs "Wow" in 2020, "Taste" and "Muddy Water" in 2022, and "Red Lights" in 2021. He was also the primary songwriter for "DLMLU" from Stray Kids' full-length Japanese album, The Sound, and "Cover Me" from their EP Rock-Star.

Hyunjin has been recognized for his contributions as a songwriter, particularly for his work on songs with emotive melodies and lyrics.

Along with songwriting, Hyunjin also does the whistling for a lot of the songs, most famously on the song 'Grow Up' on I Am Not.. He's a whistler himself and likes it.

==== SKZ-Record/Player and solo music ====
As of September 2024, Hyunjin had made nine contributions to Stray Kids' YouTube-based portfolio project, SKZ-Record/Player. These included the original solo songs "Little Star" (꼬마별), "Ice Cream" (stylised as ice.cream), "Contradicting", "Long for You", and "Hey You". "Little Star" (under the new title, "miss you"), "Ice Cream", and a new song, "Love Untold", were included in Stray Kids' digital compilation album, SKZ-Replay, released in December 2022. The remainder of his original SKZ-Record/Player songs are yet to see wider release. He also has collaborated with bandmate I.N for the original duet "미제 (untitled)", one group dance performance with Lee Know and Felix, and two solo dance performances he choreographed, one to "Play with Fire" by Sam Tinnesz featuring Yacht Money in 2022, and another to "When the Party's Over" by Billie Eilish in 2020.

As of September 2024, Hyunjin is known to have several unreleased songs, including the solo song "Mic & Brush" that he performed during Stray Kids' 5-Star Dome Tour.

=== Influences ===
Hyunjin has named Jinyoung of former labelmates Got7 as a role model.

== Impact and influence ==
Hyunjin was placed consistently in Tumblr's "K-Pop Stars of the Year", ranking 28th in 2018, 18th in 2019, 19th in 2020, 9th in 2021, and 6th in 2022. Hyunjin was ranked fifth in Billboard's 2024 K-Pop Artist 100.

Hyunjin has also been named "K-Pop's Performance Leader" via an article in October 2021, after his dance performance for Studio Choom's Artist of the Month for October was released. Hyunjin is also credited with revitalizing the long haired trend for male K-pop idols after going viral for his cover of "Psycho" by Red Velvet on KBS' Music Bank.

In February 2023, Hyunjin was named one of the five top entertainers in Korea on Forbes Korea's "Top 30 under 30" list making him the youngest at that time. On March 13, 2024, fashion magazine Vogue Business mentioned Hyunjin as the celebrity with the highest SNS engagement rate overall for the 2024 Fall Winter fashion week season (at over 37%) during the Versace's Fall-Winter 2024 fashion show.

He has been cited as an inspiration or influence by multiple artists, including Haru of Nexz and Yujin of Zerobaseone.

== Other ventures ==
=== Fashion and endorsements ===
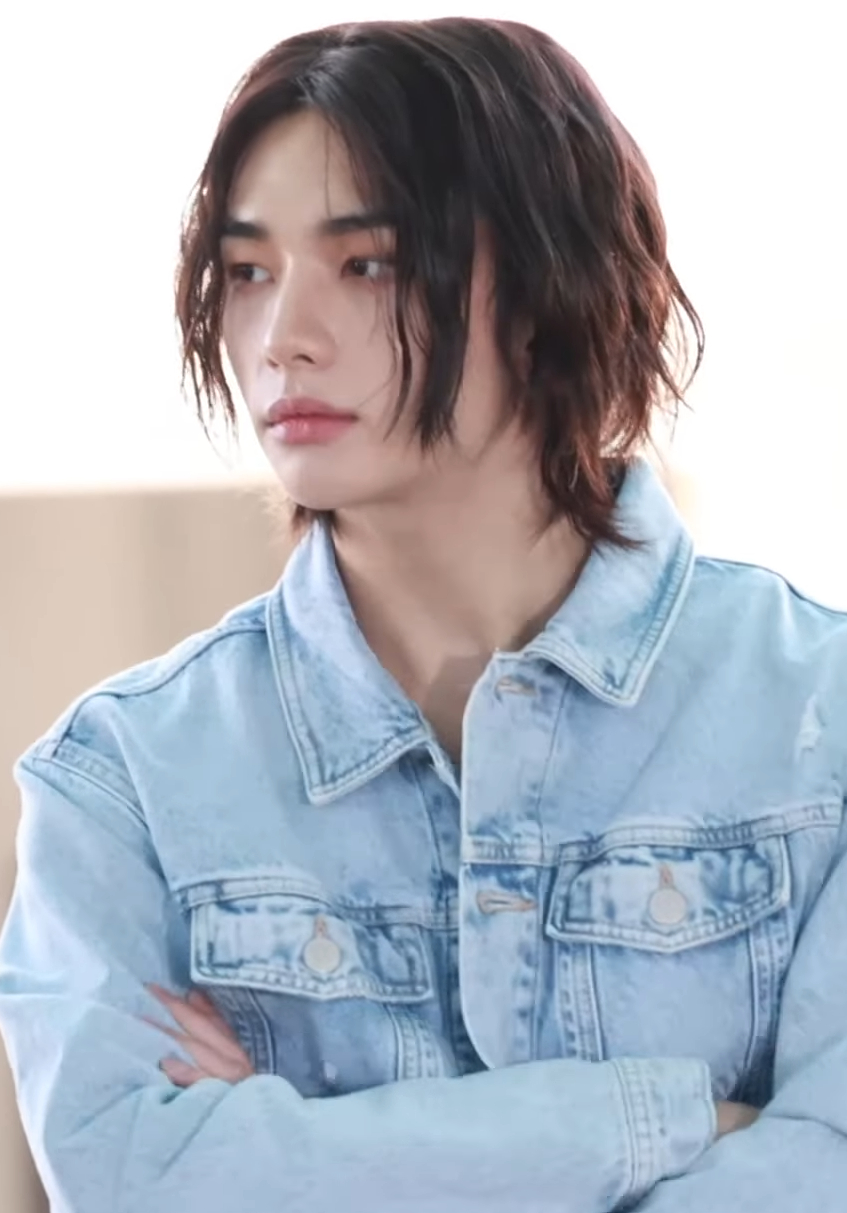
Hyunjin in May 2024

Together with bandmate and fellow DanceRacha member Lee Know, Hyunjin featured in the April 2020 issue of Arena Homme+ Korea. He was featured again in the magazine's February 2021 issue, alongside bandmate Felix, also part of Stray Kids' dance line.

In 2021, Hyunjin, Lee Know, and Felix endorsed the Earthbeat sneaker for Etro. On August 31, 2022, together with bandmate Felix, Hyunjin attended the Tod's Seoul event at Loop Station Iksun. In April 2024, Hyunjin attended a Kilian Paris event in support of endorsing the brand in W Korea. In May 2024, he made his Met Gala debut with Stray Kids as guests of Tommy Hilfiger, making them the first K-pop group to attend together wearing custom outfits by the same designer.

==== Versace ambassadorship ====
On September 5, 2022, Hyunjin and Felix attended the YSL Beauty X Dua Lipa event in Paris. In May 2023, following his meeting with Lipa, Hyunjin subsequently became one of 60 guests invited to Cannes for Dua Lipa's debut fashion show, "La Vacanza", a collaboration with Versace.

In July 2023, he also attended the opening of Versace's "La Vacanza" pop-up store in Seoul. Later that month, Hyunjin was announced as a global brand ambassador for Versace, making him the first South Korean and Asian male ambassador for the brand. The partnership led to Versace designing multiple bespoke pieces for him, including outfits he wore to perform with Stray Kids at the 2023 VMAs, Lollapalooza Paris, and the band's 5-Star Dome Tour. Hyunjin has also featured Versace designs in Stray Kids' music videos, including "S-Class". In 2024, the brand provided Hyunjin with custom outfits for Stray Kids' Dominate World Tour.

He was the face of Versace's Holiday 2023 advertising campaign. After a minor car accident delayed a planned appearance in September 2023, Hyunjin attended his first Milan Fashion Week as part of his ongoing collaboration with the brand in February 2024. In September 2024, he attended his second Milan Fashion Week, participating in the showcase for Versace's spring-summer 2025 collection.

==== Cartier ambassadorship ====
In June 2023, Hyunjin modelled for Cartier as the cover star of Esquire Korea. He modelled for the brand again in May 2024, as the cover model for Elle Korea.

In September 2024, Hyunjin was announced as a brand ambassador for Cartier, with a modeling feature for the brand in the October 2024 issue of Esquire Korea.

==== Givenchy Beauty ambassadorship ====
In February 2025, Hyunjin was announced as an ambassador for Givenchy Beauty, with a modeling feature for the brand in the March 2025 issue of Marie Claire Korea.

==== Guess ambassadorship ====
In March 2026, American clothing brand Guess appointed Hyunjin as a global ambassador.

==== Dior ambassadorship ====
After numerous appearances at the brand's events, French fashion house Dior announced in November 2026 that Hyunjin would be an ambassador for its beauty division and Jonathan Anderson's collection.

=== Philanthropy ===
On February 16, 2023, it was reported that Hyunjin donated ₩100 million (equivalent to ₩104.49 million or US$77,964.64 in 2025) through the international relief organization, The Promise, to aid the relief efforts following the earthquake in Turkey and Syria. His contributions made him appointed as a member of the honors club on March 30.

In November 2023, he participated in a fundraising event for the "Love Your W" campaign by W Korea to raise awareness about breast cancer.

In 2024, to celebrate his birthday, he donated ₩100 million (equivalent to ₩104.49 million or US$77,964.64 in 2025) to the Snail of Love, a social welfare organization that provides hearing-impaired people with artificial cochlear surgery and hearing aids to help them find sound, supports social adaptation of hearing children, and provides education to improve public awareness.

Hyunjin donated ₩100 million (equivalent to ₩104.49 million or US$77,964.64 in 2025) to Samsung Medical Center on his birthday, March 20, 2025. The donation he made will be used to cover the treatment costs of children and adolescent patients receiving treatment at Samsung Medical Center as well as emotional support activities to help them achieve psychological stability.

== Personal life ==
=== Health ===
In July 2022, Hyunjin sustained a hand injury impacting his participation in Stray Kids' Maniac World Tour.

In September 2023, Hyunjin, alongside bandmates Lee Know and Seungmin, received medical attention following a minor road accident, resulting in the modification of a planned Stray Kids performance at Global Citizen Festival.

== Discography ==
=== Songs ===
==== As lead artist ====
List of songs, showing year released, selected chart positions, and name of the album
Title	Year	Peak chart positions		Album
Title	Year	KOR DL	US World	Album
"Love Untold" (Note: credited to Stray Kids, but the track is a solo by Hyunjin)	2022	189	—	SKZ-Replay
"Contradicting" (Note: "Contradicting" was only available digitally on Youtube and Youtube Music.)	2023	—	—	Non-album songs
"Mic and Brush"	2023	—	—	SKZ-Replay 2026 Pt.1
"Long for You" (Note: "Long for You" was only available digitally on Youtube and Youtube Music.)	2024	—	—	Non-album songs
"Hey You" (Note: "Hey You" was only available digitally on Youtube and Youtube Music.)	2024	—	—	Non-album songs
"So Good"	2024	24	8	Hop
"Quill Pen" (낙서장) (Note: "Quill Pen" was only available digitally on Youtube and Youtube Music.)	2024	—	—	Non-album song
"Lover"	2026	27	—	SKZ-Replay 2026 Pt.1
"—" denotes releases that did not chart or were not released in that region.

==== As featured artist ====
List of songs, showing year released, selected chart positions, and name of the album
Title	Year	Peak chart positions					Album
Title	Year	KOR BGM	JPN Overs.	NZ Hot	UK Sales	US Rock	Album
"Rush" (Troye Sivan feat. PinkPantheress and Hyunjin)	2023	—	20	12	—	—	Non-album singles
"Untitled" (미제) (Note: The track was only available digitally on Youtube and Youtube Music.) (I.N feat. Hyunjin)	2023	—	—	—	—	—	Non-album singles
"Always Love" (D4vd featuring Hyunjin)	2025	73	—	29	64	49	Non-album singles
"—" denotes releases that did not chart or were not released in that region.

=== Songwriting credits ===
All song credits are adapted from KOMCA, unless stated otherwise.

Year	Song Title	Album	Artist	Lyrics		Music	
Year	Song Title	Album	Artist	Credit	With	Credit	With
2017	"4419"	Mixtape	Stray Kids	Yes	Bang Chan, Changbin, Han, Seungmin	No	
2018	"Mixtape #1"	I Am Not	Stray Kids	Yes	Woojin, Bang Chan, Lee Know, Changbin, Han, Felix, Seungmin, I.N	No	
2018	"Mixtape #2"	I Am Who	Stray Kids	Yes	Woojin, Bang Chan, Lee Know, Changbin, Han, Felix, Seungmin, I.N	Yes	Woojin, Bang Chan, Lee Know, Changbin, Han, Felix, Seungmin, I.N
2018	"You."	I Am You	Stray Kids	Yes	Changbin, I.N	Yes	Changbin, I.N, Hong Ji-sang
2018	"Mixtape #3"	I Am You	Stray Kids	Yes	Woojin, Bang Chan, Lee Know, Changbin, Han, Felix, Seungmin, I.N	Yes	Woojin, Bang Chan, Lee Know, Changbin, Han, Felix, Seungmin, I.N
2019	"Mixtape #4"	Clé 1: Miroh	Stray Kids	Yes	Woojin, Bang Chan, Lee Know, Changbin, Han, Felix, Seungmin, I.N	Yes	Woojin, Bang Chan, Lee Know, Changbin, Han, Felix, Seungmin, I.N
2019	"Mixtape #5"	Clé: Levanter	Stray Kids	Yes	Bang Chan, Lee Know, Changbin, Han, Felix, Seungmin, I.N	Yes	Bang Chan, Lee Know, Changbin, Han, Felix, Seungmin, I.N
2020	"Wow"	In Life	Lee Know, Hyunjin, Felix	Yes	Felix, Lee Know	No	
2021	"Red Lights" (강박)	Noeasy	Bang Chan, Hyunjin	Yes	Bang Chan	Yes	Bang Chan
2021	"Placebo" (Note: alt title of "Mixtape #1" after revision)	SKZ2021	Stray Kids	Yes	Bang Chan, Lee Know, Changbin, Han, Felix, Seungmin, I.N	No	
2021	"Behind the Light" (그림자도 빛이 있어야 존재) (Note: alt title of "Mixtape #2" after revision)	SKZ2021	Stray Kids	Yes	Bang Chan, Lee Know, Changbin, Han, Felix, Seungmin, I.N	Yes	Bang Chan, Lee Know, Changbin, Han, Felix, Seungmin, I.N
2021	"For You" (Note: Alternative title of "Mixtape #3" after revision)	SKZ2021	Stray Kids	Yes	Bang Chan, Lee Know, Changbin, Han, Felix, Seungmin, I.N	Yes	Bang Chan, Lee Know, Changbin, Han, Felix, Seungmin, I.N
2021	"Broken Compass" (Note: Alternative title of "Mixtape #4" after revision)	SKZ2021	Stray Kids	Yes	Bang Chan, Lee Know, Changbin, Han, Felix, Seungmin, I.N	Yes	Bang Chan, Lee Know, Changbin, Han, Felix, Seungmin, I.N
2021	"Hoodie Season" (Note: Alternative title of "Mixtape #5" after revision)	SKZ2021	Stray Kids	Yes	Bang Chan, Lee Know, Changbin, Han, Felix, Seungmin, I.N	Yes	Bang Chan, Lee Know, Changbin, Han, Felix, Seungmin, I.N
2022	"Muddy Water"	Oddinary	Changbin, Hyunjin, Han, Felix	Yes	Changbin, Han, Felix	Yes	Changbin, Han, Felix, Millionboy
2022	"Taste"	Maxident	Lee Know, Hyunjin, Felix	Yes	Felix, Lee Know	Yes	Felix, Lee Know, Bang Chan
2022	"Love Untold"	SKZ-Replay	Hyunjin	Yes	—N/a	Yes	Bang Chan
2022	"Ice.Cream"	SKZ-Replay	Hyunjin	Yes	—N/a	Yes	Bang Chan
2022	"#LoveStay"	SKZ-Replay	Stray Kids	Yes	Felix, I.N	Yes	Semi Kim
2022	"Miss You" (꼬마별)	SKZ-Replay	Hyunjin	Yes	—N/a	Yes	Bush
2023	"DLMLU"	The Sound	Stray Kids	Yes	Yohei	Yes	Bang Chan, Versachoi
2023	"Cover Me"	Rock-Star	Stray Kids	Yes	Bang Chan	Yes	Bang Chan, Nickko Young
2023	"Mic and Brush"	Non-album songs	Hyunjin	Yes	—N/a	Yes	Chae Ganghae, RESTART
2023	"Contradicting"	Non-album songs	Hyunjin	Yes	—N/a	Yes	Bang Chan
2023	"Untitled"	Non-album songs	I.N featuring Hyunjin	Yes	I.N	Yes	Millionboy, Nickko Young
2024	"Long for You"	Non-album songs	Hyunjin	Yes	—N/a	Yes	Joha
2024	"Hey You"	Non-album songs	Hyunjin	Yes	—N/a	Yes	Joha
2024	"So Good"	Hop	Hyunjin	Yes	—N/a	Yes	Joha
2024	"Quill Pen"	Non-album songs	Hyunjin	Yes	—N/a	Yes	Joha
2026	"Lover"	Non-album songs	Hyunjin	Yes	—N/a	Yes	Joha
"—" denotes credits that Hyunjin do alone | Total credits = 29 song

== Videography ==
=== Music videos ===
List of music videos, showing year released, artist and name of the album
Title	Year	Artist(s)	Album	Ref.
"So Good"	2024	Hyunjin	Hop	
"Lover"	2026	Hyunjin	—	

== Filmography ==
=== Television shows ===
Year	Title	Role	Notes	Ref.
2017	Stray Kids	Contestant	Debuted as a Stray Kids member	

=== Web series ===
Year	Title	Role	Notes	Ref.
2019	A-Teen 2	Cha Ah-hyun's friend	Cameo (Ep. 16)	

=== Hosting ===
Year	Title	Notes	Ref.
2019–2021	Show! Music Core	Episodes 621–714	

== Awards and nominations ==
Name of the award ceremony, year presented, award category, nominee(s) of the award, and the result of the nomination
Award ceremony	Year	Category	Nominee(s)/work(s)	Result	Ref.
Asia Artist Awards	2025	Best Choice	Himself	Won	
K-World Dream Awards	2026	Male Solo Popularity Award	Himself	Nominated	
