= Bang Chan =

Australian singer and rapper

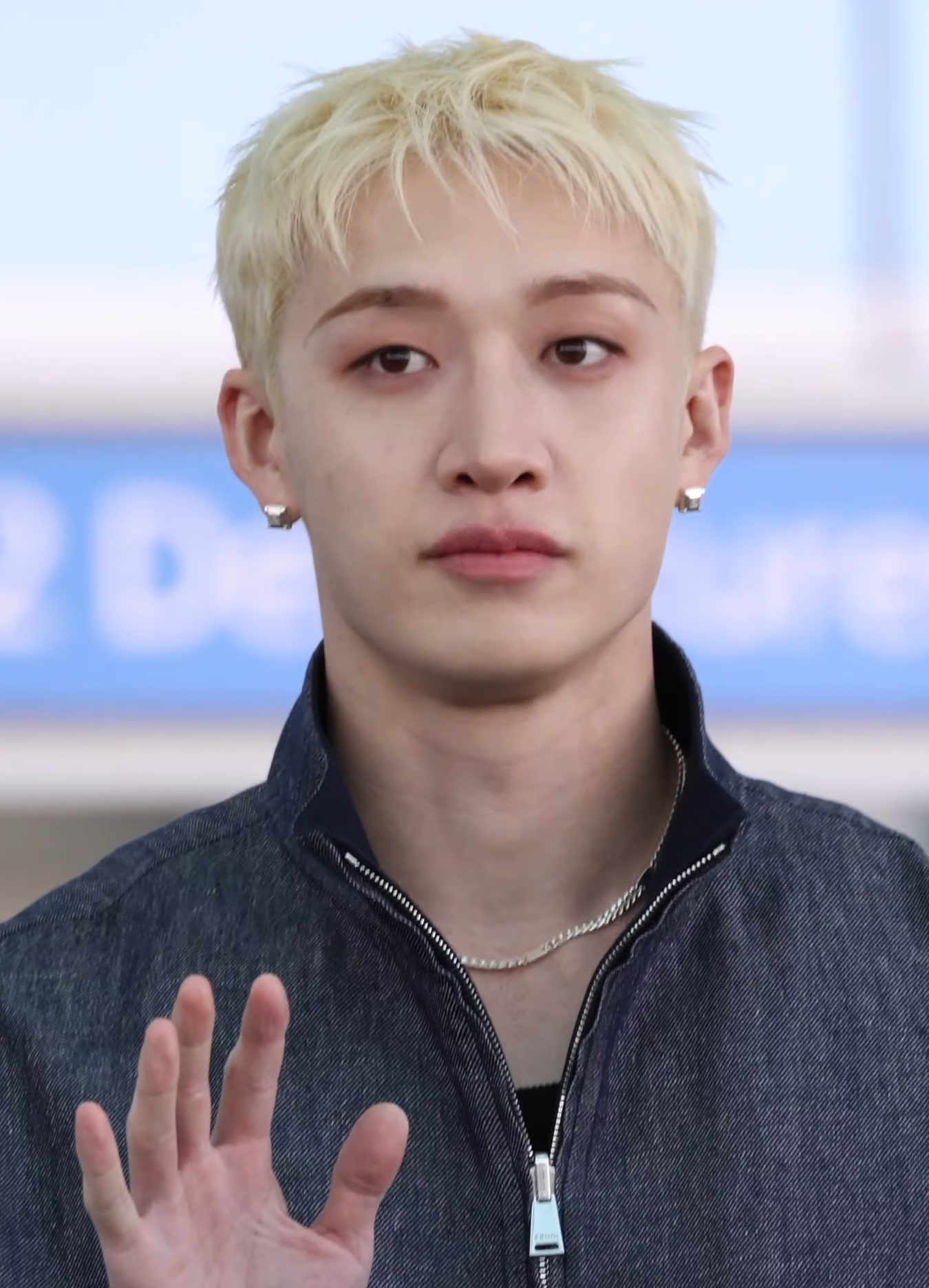
- Bang Chan in February 2026
- Born: Christopher Chahn Bahng; 3 October 1997 (age 29)
- Other name: CB97 (Note: Used when releasing songs as pre-debut 3Racha and while performing at the Global Citizen Festival in 2023.)
- Citizenship: Australia
- Education: Chungdam High School
- Occupations: Singer; rapper; songwriter; producer
- Years active: 2017–present
- Works: Songs written
- Relatives: Hannah Bahng (sister)
- Musical career
- Origin: Australia
- Genres: K-pop; hip hop; electronica; EDM; alternative rock
- Instrument: Vocals
- Label: JYP
- Member of: Stray Kids; 3Racha

Korean name
- Hangul: 방찬
- RR: Bang Chan
- MR: Pang Ch'an

Signature
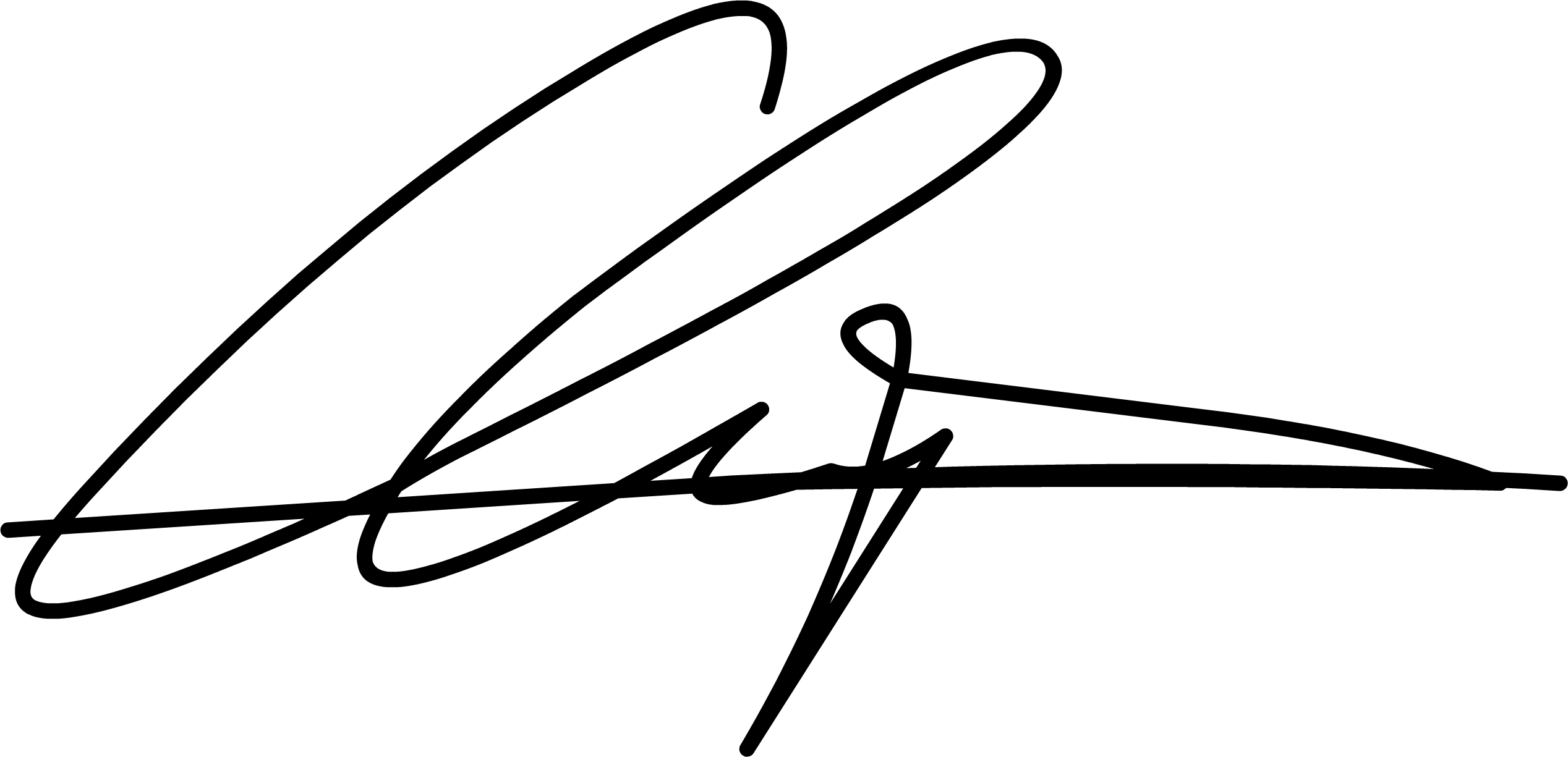

Christopher Chahn Bahng (born 3 October 1997), known professionally as Bang Chan (Korean: 방찬), is an Australian singer, rapper, songwriter, and record producer based in South Korea. Signed to JYP Entertainment, he is the leader of the South Korean boy band Stray Kids and a member of 3Racha, an in-house production team and sub-unit of Stray Kids.

Bang Chan played a pivotal role in forming Stray Kids by selecting trainees, naming the group, and designing its logo. The survival show Stray Kids documented this process, focusing on whether Bang Chan's team would debut together, in contrast to typical survival shows where agency management determines the lineup.

Since February 2023, he has been a full member of the Korea Music Copyright Association (KOMCA). Beyond creating music for Stray Kids, he has composed for TV series like Pop Out Boy!, Tower of God, and Re:Revenge – In the End of Desire, as well as films including Doraemon: Nobita's Sky Utopia and Deadpool & Wolverine. Bang Chan has also written songs for artists such as JO1, Yao Chen, and Show Lo, and collaborated with Alesso, Sky-Hi, Tiger JK, Lil Durk, and Japanese singer Lisa.

== Early life and education ==
Christopher Chahn Bahng was born on 3 October 1997 and grew up in Sydney, Australia. Bang Chan is the first of three children, and the elder brother of independent musician and YouTuber, Hannah Bahng.

He is proficient in English and Korean. He attended Newtown High School of the Performing Arts, where he trained in ballet and modern dance and was a member of the school choir. Additionally, he was a competitive swimmer, often winning medals for his performances, and a classically trained pianist, having taken lessons since the age of five.

At the age of 13, he passed the 2010 JYP Entertainment Global Audition held in Australia and moved to South Korea to become a trainee. He graduated from Chungdam High School majoring in music and acting.

== Career ==
=== 2010–2018: Pre-debut, forming 3Racha, and survival show ===
Bang Chan was a trainee for 7 years under JYP Entertainment and trained alongside members of Twice, Got7, and Day6. During his traineeship, Bang Chan made cameo appearances in music videos for other JYP Entertainment artists, including a café customer in Miss A's "Only You" and a zombie in Twice's debut, "Like Ooh-Ahh".

Bang Chan met future bandmates Han and Changbin while taking MIDI classes and together in 2016, they formed a hip-hop group called 3Racha. At this time, Bang Chan was using the pseudonym CB97. They uploaded their first mixtape, J:/2017/mixtape to SoundCloud in January 2017.

In late 2017, JYP Entertainment announced a new survival show called Stray Kids, in collaboration with Mnet, and Bang Chan was announced as a participant. He was granted the opportunity to choose his own team of trainees to prepare for debut. Alongside weekly missions, he worked closely with the group on their branding and even designed the Stray Kids logo. Additionally, he was praised for his leadership and dedication during the survival show.

In early 2018, he, along with the other Stray Kids members, released their first pre-debut album, EP Mixtape, featuring the group's self-composed songs from the survival show.

=== 2018–present: debut, Stray Kids, and sub-unit & solo activities ===
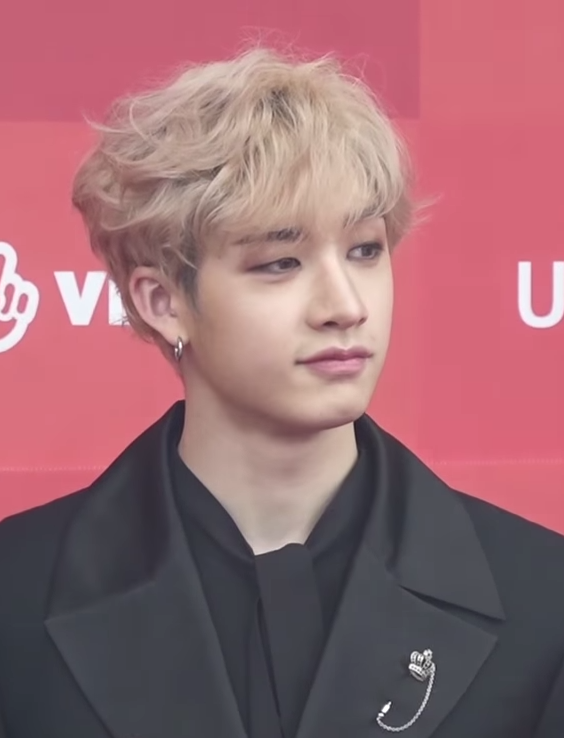
Bang Chan in 2019

Bang Chan officially debuted as the leader of Stray Kids on 25 March 2018, with the stage name Bang Chan. His roles in the group include singing, rapping, and dancing. In 2019, as part of the group's first variety show, Finding SKZ, the group travelled to Australia, where Bang Chan helped organise activities to introduce his bandmates to the culture of his homeland.

In August 2021, Bang Chan performed a cover of Day6's "I'll Try" with bandmates I.N and Seungmin on Weekly Idol.

Bang Chan and Hyunjin's first collaborative sub-unit track together, "Red Lights", was included in Stray Kids' second studio album, NoEasy. Debuting at number 30 on the Circle Download Chart, the track went on to become one of the group's top 20 most-streamed songs. He also participated in the soft rock unit track "Waiting For Us" alongside Lee Know, Seungmin, and I.N, which was part of the Oddinary EP, released on 18 March 2022. Upon its release, the track debuted at number 25 on the Circle Download Chart for the week of 13–19 March 2022.

==== SKZ-Record/Replay and solo music ====
Bang Chan has showcased solo work through Stray Kids' SKZ-Record and SKZ-Replay platforms. On 16 May 2020, he featured on Changbin's track "Streetlight", and later released the self-composed solo track "I Hate to Admit" on 29 May, through the SKZ-Record series. The release highlighted Bang Chan's introspective songwriting and personal lyrical style.

On 15 January 2021, Bang Chan was featured on I.N's solo song "Maknae on Top" alongside Changbin. On 27 June, he collaborated with Twice's Tzuyu on a cover of Taylor Swift's "Me!", released as part of Twice's Melody Project series. In July, Bang Chan with bandmate Lee Know released "Drive", a self-composed and self-produced song featured on their album SKZ-Replay. The following month, he performed the unreleased track "Yeah" at KCON LA with Han and Changbin for a special stage, the song was also co-written and produced by him.

In addition to his solo activities, Bang Chan has contributed to various unit and group tracks. He collaborated with Changbin and Han on "Zone" for the SKZ-Replay album, released on 21 December. In the same album, he also released his self-composed solo track "Connected".

Furthermore, Bang Chan co-wrote and co-composed the song "3Racha", Stray Kids' first exploration of the drill genre, which received critical acclaim. The track debuted at number 36 on the Circle Download Chart for the week of 2–8 October 2022, and was later ranked 14th on NME's year-end list. That same year, as part of 3Racha, he co-wrote, composed, and performed "Heyday" for the Street Man Fighter soundtrack.

Bang Chan further explored solo artistry during the 5-Star Dome Tour in 2023, performing his then-unreleased song "Baby" at Tokyo Dome. In March 2024, he released the music video for his English single "Eternity", which featured his pet dog, Berry. In the same year, he also worked as the vocal arranger for the JYP-produced single "Like Magic", created for Coca-Cola's K-Wave campaign. In September, during the Dominate tour, Bang Chan revealed and performed his unreleased solo song titled "Railway". The song was later included in the Hop album and officially released on December 13.

In April 2025, Bang Chan was one of several artists to appear on Astro's special release, "Moon: Memory of the Moon" (꿈속의 문), a tribute released to commemorate the second anniversary of Moonbin's death. It peaked at number 4 on the World Digital Song Sales chart. In behind the scenes footage from session recordings, Bang Chan said of his late friend, "I guess I never told you properly... thank you, and I miss you."

On SKZ-REPLAY 2026 PT 1, Bang Chan had two solo tracks: Roman Empire, which was previously released in 2025 in collaboration with fashion brand Fendi which Bang Chan serves as an ambassador for, and Baby, his Tokyo Dome Tour performance track. In addition, he wrote one of fellow member Seungmin's tracks, "Goodbye".

==== Songwriting and production ====
Bang Chan along with bandmates Han and Changbin, writes and produces most of the group's music. In addition to his work with Stray Kids, he has also written and produced for other artists, contributing to various projects outside the group, demonstrating his skills as a songwriter and producer. He has written or produced for artists and groups including NiziU, JO1, Sky-Hi, and Show Lo. Bang Chan contributed to the songwriting and composition of Taiwanese singer Show Lo's track "我的世代 (Wo De Shi Dai)" from his full-length album No Idea, released in 2019, marking his first notable collaboration outside of Stray Kids.

In April 2020, Stray Kids contributed to the soundtrack for the first season of the anime adaptation of Tower of God. Bang Chan co-wrote the opening theme "Top" and the ending theme "Slump", with him co-producing "Top" and solely producing "Slump". The single "Top" reached the top of the Oricon daily single rankings and dominated Tower Records' daily sales rankings on its release date, with all three versions securing the top three positions. In December, Bang Chan, as part of the producing team 3Racha, composed the solo song "Nevermind" for Yao Chen, a member of the Chinese boy group R1SE. The track became popular, topping the daily popularity chart on QQ Music for 16 consecutive days.

Expanding his contributions, in February 2022, Bang Chan co-wrote and featured on the song "Just Breathe" in collaboration with Japanese rapper Sky-Hi. He and the other 3Racha members were awarded Best Hip Hop Video at the MTV VMAs Japan 2022 for their work on the track. Notably, in March, the same year, Bang Chan co-wrote and produced the song "YOLO-konde" for the Japanese global boy band JO1. The track was created as a theme song to support JO1 and their fans. In February 2023, Bang Chan, Changbin, and Han were promoted to regular members of KOMCA. As of August 2026, he has 243 songs registered to his name, the most among K-pop idols.

In addition, Bang Chan contributed to major film soundtracks, starting in early 2023 when he, along with Han and Changbin, was approached to write and produce "Paradise" for NiziU's 5th single, which became the theme song for Doraemon: Nobita's Sky Utopia. The song was also used as the ending theme for the Doraemon television series. Continuing his work in television, Bang Chan participated in writing and producing the song "Why?" for the Fuji TV drama Re:Revenge- In the End of Desire, alongside 3Racha. Released on 12 April 2024, the track marked Stray Kids' first theme song for a Japanese drama.

Expanding into film soundtracks, in July, he co-wrote and co-produced the song "Slash" for the soundtrack of the Marvel film Deadpool & Wolverine, marking his first work for a Hollywood film.

==== Hosting and MC roles ====
In 2018, Bang Chan was a guest host twice on After School Club, co-hosting with Jimin on 12 June and as a special host on 17 July, when Day6's Jae graduated from the show. On 27 October 2018, he appeared as a special MC on Show! Music Core.

In August 2021, after the band came to the actor's attention for their Deadpool-inspired performance during the third round of Kingdom: Legendary War, Bang Chan interviewed Ryan Reynolds for Naver TV as part of promotions for the film Free Guy. Bang Chan served as the MC for KCON LA in August 2022, and returned as MC in 2023, hosting the third day. In December 2023, Bang Chan served as a special judge on Nizi Project Season 2.

In July 2024, Bang Chan and Felix hosted a radio series titled All About Stray Kids Radio on Apple Music. The four-episode series featured discussions about their interests, hobbies, and behind-the-scenes stories from album production, with guest appearances from other Stray Kids members. The show aired live on Apple Music Radio, with episodes also available on Apple Podcasts. During the same month, Bang Chan and Felix also interviewed Ryan Reynolds and Hugh Jackman at a press conference for Deadpool & Wolverine in Seoul, South Korea, as part of a promotional event for Marvel Korea.

== Artistry ==
Bang Chan is widely recognized for his multifaceted role as a singer, songwriter, producer, and performer in the K-pop industry. In 2020, Jeff Benjamin described Bang Chan as an artistic jack of all trades in Stray Kids, showcasing his versatility as both the lead vocalist and lead rapper while taking center stage in choreography, reflecting his extensive dance training. Bang Chan is also part of 3Racha, a sub-unit within Stray Kids that focuses on creating music that pushes the boundaries of traditional K-pop, blending elements of hip-hop, EDM, and pop-rock. As the group's leader, Bang Chan significantly influences their musical direction by writing, composing, and producing the majority of their songs, making vital contributions to their discography.

=== Influences ===
Bang Chan was encouraged by his mother's love of pop music to take an interest in the music industry. As a child, Bang Chan looked up to entertainers like Hugh Jackman, who could sing, dance, and act, admiring their versatility and charismatic presence. During his years as a trainee, he became close with Young K of Day6, who often acted as a mentor to Bang Chan.

=== Songwriting and production ===
His songwriting and production skills have garnered critical praise for their depth and versatility. Bang Chan's lyrics often reflect themes of self-reflection, struggle, and personal growth, which resonate with the global fanbase. In addition to producing for Stray Kids, he has produced tracks for other artists and frequently collaborates with fellow 3Racha members, Changbin and Han, who also contribute to the group's unique sound.

In addition to winning Best Hip Hop Video at the MTV VMAs Japan 2022 for their work on the track "Just Breathe", Bang Chan, Han, and Changbin received the Best Creator Award at the 2023 Asia Artist Awards held on 14 December, highlighting his contributions as a songwriter and producer.

In 2023, Bang Chan was recognized on the KBS 2TV variety show Beat Coin for his substantial music royalty earnings, attributed to his extensive songwriting credits. In May 2023, it was reported that both Bang Chan and fellow Stray Kids member Changbin held copyrights for approximately 150 songs. In March 2025, Billboard Brasil reported that Bang Chan is the third most credited K-pop idol on KOMCA with 210 songs attributed under his name, following Ravi and RM.

In 2024, Billboard stated that Bang Chan has played a "crucial role" in Stray Kids' success as a songwriter and producer, contributing to multiple No. 1 albums on the Billboard 200 and co-producing and writing their first Hot 100 entry, "Lalalala".

== Impact ==
He has consistently ranked in Tumblr's "K-Pop Stars of the Year", placing 14th in 2018, 8th in 2019, 11th in 2020, and 8th in both 2021 and 2022. Since his debut, Bang Chan has consistently ranked in the Boy Group Individual Brand Reputation Rankings, including making the top 100 list in 2018. On 20 April, the next year, the Korea Enterprise Reputation Research Institute announced that Bang Chan ranked 30th in their boy group individual brand reputation rankings for 19 March to 19 April. He was also ranked the 81st most-searched K-Pop idol in 2020 by K-Pop Idol Chart's '2020 Top 100 YouTube Worldwide Search Rankings'. Billboard ranked Bang Chan second in their 2024 K-Pop Artist 100.

In 2022, Bang Chan, along with Han and Changbin, was acknowledged by Paper magazine as one of the "most prolific self-produced idols" in South Korea, contributing to the evolving sound of K-pop's current generation. In addition, Bang Chan has been recognized for his "instrumental role" in Stray Kids' global success, particularly through his contributions to the group's discography, as noted by Teen Vogue. In a Daily Sports X Mubeat Weekly Choice poll conducted from 20 to 26 January 2022, Bang Chan ranked 2nd receiving 946,705 votes and was recognized as the idol leader expected to lead K-pop in 2022. In May 2022, in a poll conducted by Ilgan Sports and Mubeat, Bang Chan was named "the best self-produced idol", receiving over 203,000 votes out of 357,796. His skills as a producer, vocalist, dancer, and rapper were highlighted, showcasing his impact on Stray Kids' global success.

== Other ventures ==
=== Fashion and endorsements ===
Bang Chan made his first solo magazine cover appearance on the March 2021 issue of Men's Folio. In February 2024, he appeared on his first solo magazine cover in Japan for Nylon Japan's special edition themed "One Love, One Life", featuring Swarovski's jewelry. The edition includes a double cover, visuals, and mini photo cards, emphasizing his role as the leader of Stray Kids and conveying messages to fans. In May, he made his Met Gala debut with other Stray Kids members as the guest of Tommy Hilfiger. In the same month Bang Chan appeared on the cover of W Korea's Volume 6, where he showcased Fendi's summer capsule collection in line with his appearance at the 16th Seoul Jazz Festival. The next month, Bang Chan made his solo debut at Milan Fashion Week, attending Fendi's 2025 Spring/Summer men's fashion show as a guest of the brand. Bang Chan's appearance at Milan Fashion Week SS25 Men's Wear generated $3.43 million in earned media value (EMV), making him the fifth most influential figure in that event. In November 2025, He and Felix, an Australian native, participated in Tourism Australia's campaign "Come and Say G'day Chapter 2" in South Korea.

==== Fendi ambassadorship ====
On 16 January 2025, Fendi announced Bang Chan as its new brand ambassador. In the same month, it was announced that Bang Chan will appear on the cover of the February issue of Harper's Bazaar Korea. This marks his first project as the brand ambassador for the Italian luxury fashion house. The pictorial and interview were subsequently republished across several international editions of the magazine, including digital covers for Harper's Bazaar Thailand, Harper's Bazaar Men Taiwan, and Harper's Bazaar Man Singapore. He also appeared in both the print and digital editions of Harper's Bazaar Singapore, and a selection of the pictorial was featured in the May 2025 issue of Harper's Bazaar Japan. On 16 February, he attended Milan Fashion Week for Fendi Women's and Men's Fall/Winter 2025/2026 collection. On 24 September, he attended Milan Fashion Week for the third time to attend Fendi's S/S '26 show. He wrote and produced a song for Fendi, titled "Roman Empire". Its music video, filmed at Palazzo della Civiltà Italiana, Rome, was released on 3 November.

=== Philanthropy ===
In 2021, Bang Chan participated in JYP Entertainment's "Every Dream Matters" initiative, together with Sana of Twice and company founder Park Jin-young. This event promoted charitable projects for children battling terminal and incurable illnesses. In December 2023, Bang Chan co-hosted the fourth EDM Day with Park and Jihyo of Twice, taking part in the Love Earth Challenge campaign and meeting children interested in joining the entertainment industry.

In August 2023, Bang Chan performed as part of 3Racha at the annual Global Citizen Festival, including addressing the need for social change and an end to world poverty.

On 3 October 2024, Bang Chan donated ₩100 million (equivalent to ₩104.49 million or US$77,964.64 in 2025) to the Community Chest of Korea to mark his birthday, supporting people with developmental disabilities by funding health check-up systems and capacity-building training for athletes, and joining its Honor Society of high-value donors. In the same month, he participated in W Korea's breast cancer awareness campaign at the "Love Your W" charity event, promoting positive influence and raising awareness about breast cancer.

On 3 October 2025, his birthday, Bang Chan donated a total of ₩200 million (equivalent to ₩208.99 million or US$155,929.27 in 2025), with ₩100 million (equivalent to ₩104.49 million or US$77,964.64 in 2025) million each to Samsung Medical Center and the Korean Committee for UNICEF. The donation will support the treatment of children and adolescents at Samsung Medical Center, while UNICEF will allocate the funds to global projects in health, nutrition, water and sanitation, education, protection, and emergency relief. Following the contribution, he was inducted into the UNICEF Honors Club, a group of major donors to UNICEF.

In September 2026, Bang Chan donated ₩200 million (equivalent to ₩208.99 million or US$155,929.27 in 2025), delivering 100 million won each, to Seoul Rehabilitation Hospital for a specialized rehabilitation center tailored to its patients' ages and medical conditions, and to the Korean Committee for UNICEF in support of recovery efforts for flood victims in Nepal. The next month, his 29th birthday, he further donated ₩300 million (equivalent to ₩313.48 million or US$233,893.91 in 2025), 100 million won each, to Hearcycle, World Vision, and Our Sea of East Asia Network (OSEAN).

== Discography ==
=== Songs ===
==== As lead artist ====
List of songs, showing year released, selected chart positions, and name of the album
Title	Year	Peak chart positions					Album
Title	Year	KOR DL	JPN DL	NZ Hot	UK Sales	US World	Album
"Not!" (with Lee Know and Seungmin)	2018	—	—	—	—	—	I Am Not
"We Go" (with Changbin and Han)	2020	—	—	—	—	10	In Life
"Red Lights" (강박) (with Hyunjin)	2021	30	—	—	—	13	Noeasy
"Waiting for Us" (피어난다) (with Lee Know, Seungmin, and I.N)	2022	25	—	—	—	—	Oddinary
"3Racha" (with Changbin and Han)	2022	36	—	24	—	13	Maxident
"Connected"	2022	—	—	—	—	—	SKZ-Replay
"Zone" (with Changbin and Han)	2022	—	—	—	—	—	SKZ-Replay
"I Hate to Admit" (인정하기 싫어)	2022	—	—	—	—	—	SKZ-Replay
"Up All Night" (오늘 밤 나는 불을 켜) (with Changbin, Felix and Seungmin)	2022	—	—	—	—	—	SKZ-Replay
"Drive" (with Lee Know)	2022	—	—	—	—	—	SKZ-Replay
"Heyday" (as 3Racha with Changbin and Han)	2022	118	—	—	—	13	Street Man Fighter Original Vol.4 Crew Songs
"Black Hole" (with I.N)	2023	—	—	—	—	—	Non-album single (Note: Released only on YouTube as part of SKZ-Record project.)
"Eternity"	2024	—	—	—	—	—	Non-album single
"Railway"	2024	33	—	15	—	—	Hop
"Escape" (with Hyunjin)	2025	148	100	24	35	1	Mixtape: Dominate
"Roman Empire"	2025	—	—	—	—	—	SKZ-Replay 2026 Pt.1
"Baby"	2026	—	—	—	—	—	SKZ-Replay 2026 Pt.1
"—" denotes releases that did not chart or were not released in that region.

==== As featured artist ====
List of songs, showing year released, selected chart positions, and name of the album
Title	Year	Peak chart positions					Album
Title	Year	KOR DL	HUN	JPN Cmb.	JPN Hot	US World	Album
"Just Breathe" (Sky-Hi featuring 3Racha)	2022	—	15	50	50	11	The Debut
"Streetlight" (Changbin featuring Bang Chan)	2022	—	—	—	—	—	SKZ-Replay
"Maknae on Top" (막내온탑) (I.N featuring Bang Chan and Changbin)	2022	—	—	—	—	—	SKZ-Replay
"Moon" (꿈속의 문) (Astro with Viviz, Minhyuk, Kihyun, I.M, Hoshi, Wonwoo, Mingyu, DK, Seungkwan, Hello Gloom, Rocky, Yoojung, Doyeon, Chani, Bang Chan, Moon Sua)	2025	61	—	—	—	4	Non-album single
"—" denotes releases that did not chart or were not released in that region.

== Videography ==
=== Music videos ===
List of music videos, showing year released, artist and name of the album
Title	Year	Artist(s)	Album	Ref.
"Railway"	2024	Bang Chan	Hop	

== Filmography ==
=== Television shows ===
Year	Show Title	Notes	Ref.
2017	Stray Kids	Himself	
2018	After School Club	Episode 320 (as Special MC)	
2018	After School Club	Episode 325 (as Special MC)	
2018	Show! Music Core	Special MC	
2020	Knowing Bros	After school activities: Dong Dong Shin Ki (Episode 5-6) (Note: Part of Knowing Bros special series (Ep. 242-243)) (with Wooyoung)	
2023	Nizi Project Season 2	Special Judge (1 episode)	

=== Hosting ===
Year	Title	Role	Ref.
2019–2023	찬이의 '방' (Chan's Room)	Host	
2022	KCON LA 2022	MC	
2023	KCON LA 2023	MC	

== Awards and nominations ==
Name of the award ceremony, year presented, award category, nominee(s) of the award, and the result of the nomination
Award ceremony	Year	Category	Nominee(s)/work(s)	Result	Ref.
Asian Pop Music Awards	2025	Best Producer	Karma	Nominated	
Korea Grand Music Awards	2026	K-Wave Popularity	Himself	Pending	
