= Felix (rapper) =

Australian rapper (born 2000)

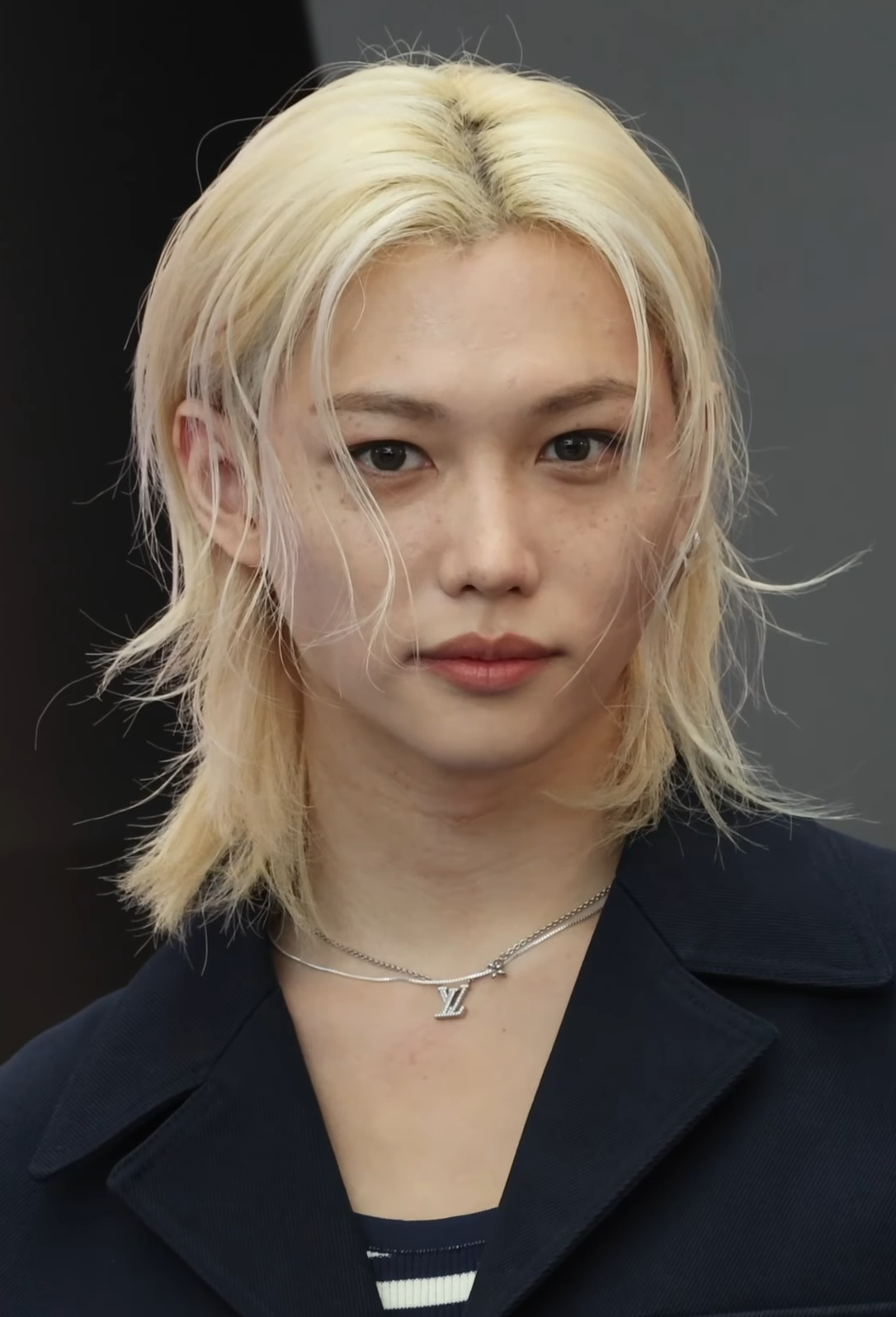
- Felix in 2026
- Born: Felix Yongbok Lee; 15 September 2000 (age 26); Sydney, New South Wales, Australia
- Occupations: Rapper; singer
- Years active: 2017–present
- Musical career
- Genre: K-pop
- Instrument: Vocals
- Label: JYP
- Member of: Stray Kids

Korean name
- Hangul: 이용복
- RR: I Yongbok
- MR: I Yongbok

Felix Yongbok Lee (born 15 September 2000), known mononymously as Felix (Korean: 필릭스), is an Australian rapper and singer based in South Korea. He is a member of the South Korean boy band Stray Kids, formed by JYP Entertainment in 2017.

== Early life ==
Felix Yongbok Lee was born on 15 September 2000 in Sydney, New South Wales, Australia. He is of Korean descent and has two sisters, one older and one younger. During his childhood, he practiced taekwondo for twelve years, achieving a black belt and reportedly winning 63 medals.

He attended Metella Road Public School and St Patrick's Marist College in Dundas, New South Wales before being scouted on Facebook for an audition to become a K-pop trainee. He subsequently signed with South Korean record label JYP Entertainment at the age of 17.

== Career ==
=== 2017–present: Survival show, debut with Stray Kids, and solo activities ===
Initially, Felix found the difference between school life in Australia and trainee life in South Korea quite challenging, compounded by working to reach fluency in the Korean language. However, he was personally chosen by Stray Kids' leader, Bang Chan, to participate in the survival show after one year of training at JYP Entertainment.

From 17 October to 19 December 2017, Felix appeared in the Mnet survival show Stray Kids, a show which ultimately allowed him to debut as a Stray Kids member. He faced elimination in the eighth episode, decided by Park Jin-young, the founder and CCO of JYP Entertainment. However, following careful consideration and a fan vote, Felix was reinstated in the group in the following episode.

In 2018, Felix, along with the other Stray Kids members, was credited for the song lyrics for their pre-debut EP Mixtape. Felix officially debuted with Stray Kids on 25 March 2018, through their debut showcase of the group, Stray Kids Unveil (Op. 01: I Am Not), at Jangchung Arena. On the next day, Felix with Stray Kids released their EP titled I Am Not and the lead single "District 9" which they showcased during the debut showcase. In this album, he also participated in the lyrics making of song "Mixtape #1".

==== Solo appearances, guest features, and SKZ-Record/Player ====
Individually, Felix was the host of the music program Pops in Seoul from July 2019 to January 2020. In June 2022, Felix featured on his labelmate Nayeon's "No Problem" from her debut EP Im Nayeon. Felix made a cameo appearance in the music video for his labelmate NiziU's South Korean debut single "Heartris" in October 2023. In November 2024, he featured on Japanese singer Lisa's song "Reawaker", an opening theme for the second season of Japanese anime series Solo Leveling, subtitled Arise from the Shadow.

His first solo song "Deep End" was included on Stray Kids' compilation album SKZ-Replay in December 2022. During the group's 5-Star Dome Tour in 2023, he first performed his solo song "Rev It Up", which was later released as part of SKZ-REPLAY 2026.

On 3 October 2025, Felix, together with his bandmates Han and I.N released the song "Genie" as part of Netflix original series Genie, Make a Wish's original soundtrack. On 1 September 2026, he released his solo single, "Slow It Down", as part of SKZ-Replay 2026.

== Artistry ==
Together with Lee Know and Hyunjin, Felix is part of the main dance line of Stray Kids, a subunit commonly referred to by both the group and its fandom as DanceRacha, a play on the name of Stray Kids' production subunit, 3Racha.

He is noted for the precision, energy, and charisma he brings to dancing and performances overall.

Felix is noted for having a deep voice, which he makes conscious effort to use to maximum effect on Stray Kids' tracks.

=== Influences and Influence ===
Felix first became interested in K-pop when he became aware of the group 2PM. He enjoys a variety of pop music from all over the world, including the songs of Sam Smith.

== Fashion and endorsements ==
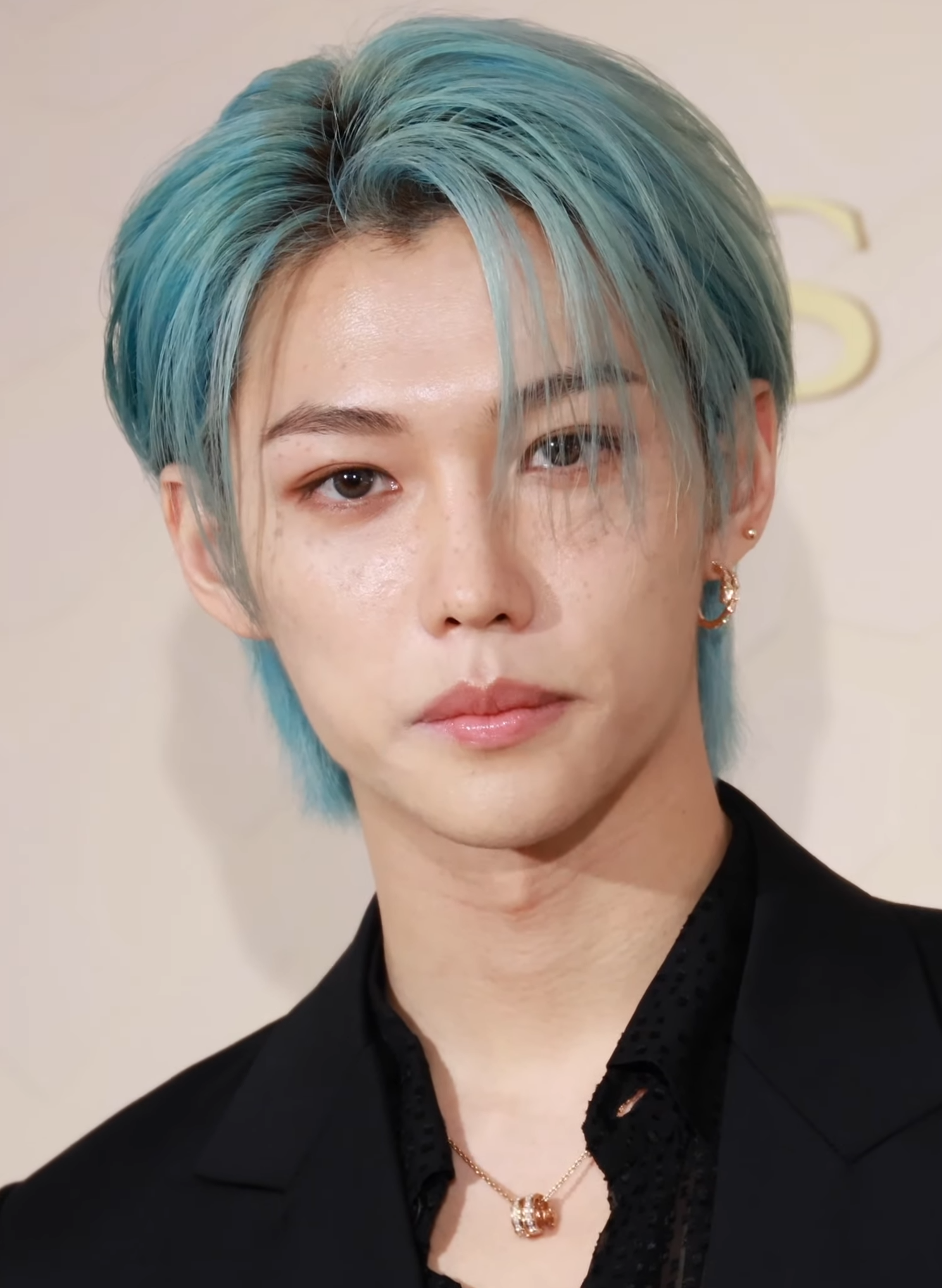
Felix at the Bulgari Serpenti exhibition in Seoul, June 2023

In addition to his work with Stray Kids, Felix has worked as a host for various programs and serves as a brand ambassador for Louis Vuitton and a goodwill ambassador for UNICEF Korea, among others.

Known for his freckles and his platinum blond mullet, Felix has been described by Teen Vogue as a "fashion star in the making", and has been noted as having an ethereal, elfin appearance. He has expressed an interest in androgynous and gender neutral fashion, and in 2024, British Vogue named him one of several male celebrities at the forefront of the "babygirl" aesthetic.

He has cultivated an experimental image, embracing colour and accessories including bags, jewellery, glasses, and platform sneakers, and enjoys using make up, hairstyles, and other visual styling to enhance his outfits. In an interview he mentioned that growing up seeing creative and fashionable people express themselves via clothing inspired his own sense of style.

In February 2021, Felix featured alongside bandmate Hyunjin in Arena Homme+ Korea.

On 31 August 2022, together with Hyunjin, Felix attended the Tod's Seoul event at Loop Station Iksun. On 5 September 2022, Felix and Hyunjin attended the YSL Beauty X Dua Lipa event in Paris.

In June 2023, Felix attended the Bulgari Serpenti exhibition, "75 Years of Infinite Tales", in Seoul.

In May 2024, Felix made his Met Gala debut with Stray Kids, for which he gained viral attention. His make up and hairstyling were noted for their "fairycore vibes", with some commentators drawing comparisons between Felix and famous fantasy characters such as Legolas from The Lord of the Rings.

Felix first attended Paris Fashion Week on 5 March 2024, and six months later, made his New York Fashion Week debut in September 2024, attending as a guest alongside bandmate Lee Know.

In November 2025, Felix and bandmate Bang Chan, an Australian native, participated in Tourism Australia's campaign "Come and Say G'day Chapter 2" in South Korea. In 2026, he was appointed as the honorary ambassador for the 140th anniversary of France–South Korea diplomatic relations, alongside actress Jun Ji-hyun, the new face of the "2026 Hanbok Wave" campaign by the Ministry of Culture, Sports and Tourism and Korea Craft & Arts Design Foundation to promote hanbok worldwide, and the global model for fried chicken brand BBQ.

=== Louis Vuitton ambassadorship ===
Felix at the Louis Vuitton Visionary Journeys exhibition opening, December 2025

On 29 April 2023, Felix attended Louis Vuitton's Pre-Fall 2023 show in Seoul. It was at this event that the brand's creative director of womenswear, Nicolas Ghesquière, met Felix and noted "his energy, his unique personality, and his audacious sense of style". Felix has since been described as a "muse" of Ghesquière. Felix later attended the 2024 Louis Vuitton cruise show in May 2023, and was dressed by the brand for Stray Kids' performance at Lollapalooza Paris 2023.

In August 2023, Felix was chosen as the house ambassador for Louis Vuitton. By October it was estimated the partnership had delivered approximately $4.5 million in media impact value for the brand. Subsequently, Felix wore several items from the brand while performing on Stray Kids' 5-Star Dome Tour. In October 2023, he attended Louis Vuitton's Spring-Summer 2024 show at Paris Fashion Week. In November 2023, he was named one of GQ Korea's Men of the Year and featured on the cover of the magazine's December issue.

In May 2024, he attended the Louis Vuitton cruise show 2025 in Barcelona. A scheduling conflict meant Felix was unable to attend the Spring-Summer 2025 collection show in autumn 2024, but he worked with the brand on a variety of online promotional content for the show.

In March 2025, Felix modelled items from the 'Soft Power' Spring-Summer 2025 collection for Louis Vuitton in Vogue Korea. In May 2025, he attended the Louis Vuitton cruise show 2026 in Avignon.

Louis Vuitton provided Felix with a variety of custom pieces to wear on Stray Kids' DominATE world tour.

On 3 July 2025, Louis Vuitton announced that Felix had collaborated with the brand on the Silver Lockit 2025 limited edition jewellery collection, from which each sale would contribute to UNICEF.

On 30 September 2025, Felix attended Louis Vuitton's Womenswear Spring-Summer 2026 collection show in Paris.

==== Runway model debut ====
Felix made his runway debut at Paris Fashion Week for Louis Vuitton Women's Fall-Winter 2024 Collection at Cour Carrée on 5 March 2024, including leading the runway's finale together with actress and model Jung Ho-yeon, who gave him advice on walking in heels. On 10 March 2025, Felix made runway return at the Louis Vuitton Women's Fall-Winter 2025 Collection for Paris Fashion Week.

=== Partnership with II Combined ===
Felix has also frequently collaborated with South Korean luxury goods corporate group II Combined, and is a brand representative for several of its child companies, including eyewear brand Gentle Monster, fragrance brand Tamburins, and headwear label ATiiSSU.

In September 2025, Felix was unveiled as the star of Tamburins' campaign for their "Sunshine" perfume collection. Later the same month, Felix attended the opening of Gentle Monster's store in Ginza.

=== Hera ambassadorship ===
In August 2025, Felix was announced as a global ambassador for the luxury beauty brand Hera, making him the first male ambassador for the brand. A brand representatived cited Felix's "unique aura and multifaceted charm" as central to their international consumer outreach.

His first campaigns for the brand included the global campaign for the 'Reflection Skin Glow' cosmetics range, and the launch of a new lip colour inspired by Felix, 'Brownie Boy,' for Hera's Sensual Nude Gloss product line.

=== Gong Cha ambassadorship ===
In 2025, Felix was announced as a global brand ambassador for the tea drink chain Gong Cha, making him the first K-pop idol to represent the brand.

The brand announced plans for a variety of limited-edition products featuring Felix, initially in South Korea before expanding to overseas stores. Beginning in June 2025, Korean branches of Gong Cha introduced a "Felix Pick" menu, featuring a selection of his favourite bubble teas, and incorporated Felix's voice into self-service checkouts.

In August 2025, Gong Cha released a limited-edition cup sleeve as part of the "Felix's Favourites' Experience" brand event.

=== Other endorsements and brand deals ===
In 2021, together with bandmates and fellow DanceRacha members Lee Know and Hyunjin, Felix endorsed the Earthbeat sneaker for Etro.

Since August 2023, Felix has been Louis Vuitton's Global House Ambassador, anchoring fashion shows and seasonal campaigns.

In February 2024, Felix modeled for Bulgari Parfum in a beauty pictorial for Vogue Korea.

As part of Stray Kids, Felix has worked with brands including Clio, Nacific, and OHTNYC.

In 2025, Felix became a face of the smartphone Samsung Galaxy S25 Edge, and an ambassador of Spotify and Naver collaborative campaign.

In 2026, Adidas appointed Felix to be its global icon and ambassador, and Lotte Chilsung's prebiotic soda Happiz chose him for the brand's first ambassador.

== Philanthropy ==
In 2020, Felix began consistent donations and sponsorship for the international children's rights organisation Save the Children. His contributions have made him a member of the charity's honours club. He also donated ₩50 million (equivalent to ₩52.25 million or US$38,982.32 in 2025) for the relief effort following the 2023 Turkey–Syria earthquakes.

In 2023, he participated in the "Love Your W" campaign by W Korea to raise awareness about breast cancer.

In January 2024, Felix donated ₩100 million (equivalent to ₩104.49 million or US$77,964.64 in 2025) to the Korean Committee for UNICEF to help Laotian children living with poor sanitation and nutrition, making him the youngest member of the UNICEF Honors Club. In February, Felix went to UNICEF's Laos project site and did volunteer work with his mother. In celebration of his birthday that year, he also donated ₩50 million (equivalent to ₩52.25 million or US$38,982.32 in 2025) to the UNICEF for nutrition and water sanitation support project of children in Laos and another ₩50 million (equivalent to ₩52.25 million or US$38,982.32 in 2025) to the World Vision for breakfast support project of underprivileged children in Korea.

In recognition of all his philanthropic acts, Felix was appointed as UNICEF Goodwill Ambassador for Korea. On 23 December, the Korean Committee for UNICEF announced that Felix would be joining the 'UNICEF Team' campaign with Kim Yuna, Kim Hye-soo, and Faker.

To celebrate his birthday in 2025, Felix donated ₩100 million (equivalent to ₩104.49 million or US$77,964.64 in 2025) to Samsung Medical Center to support the treatment of children and adolescents, ₩50 million (equivalent to ₩52.25 million or US$38,982.32 in 2025) to UNICEF to fund the nutrition and water sanitation project in Laos, and ₩50 million (equivalent to ₩52.25 million or US$38,982.32 in 2025) to World Vision to support children in need of family care.

Felix made the donations on his birthday in 2026, giving ₩100 million (US$74,611.5) each to Samsung Medical Center to cover medical expenses for children and adolescents with cancer and Seoul National University Children’s Hospital to support children from vulnerable backgrounds, and ₩50 million (US$37,305.75) each to Books International to support the creation and production of picture books in children’s native languages as part of cultural education and awareness programs using picture books as a medium and UNICEF Korea to be used for emergency relief efforts following severe flooding in Nepal.

== Personal life ==
=== Health ===
In February 2022, Felix was diagnosed with intervertebral disc herniation, that has presented challenges for his performances of more physically taxing choreography, but which he works to overcome with physiotherapy.

On 15 February 2025, Felix was involved in a car accident resulting in an injury which was initially reported as a fracture in his arm, but was later clarified as a pinched nerve near the site of a childhood injury, resulting in him being unable to attend Stray Kids' fan meeting scheduled for 16 February.

== Discography ==
=== Songs ===
==== As lead artist ====
List of songs, showing year released, selected chart positions, and name of the album
Title	Year	Peak chart positions						Album
Title	Year	KOR DL	JPN DL	NZ Hot	UK Sales	US Rap Dig.	US World	Album
"Who?" (with Lee Know and Han)	2018	—	—	—	—	—	—	I Am Who
"Wow" (with Lee Know and Hyunjin)	2020	—	—	—	—	—	12	In Life
"Surfin'" (with Lee Know and Changbin)	2021	29	—	—	—	—	—	Noeasy
"Muddy Water" (with Changbin, Hyunjin, and Han)	2022	26	—	—	—	—	—	Oddinary
"Taste" (with Lee Know and Hyunjin)	2022	32	—	23	—	—	9	Maxident
"Deep End"	2022	178	—	—	—	—	—	SKZ-Replay
"Because" (좋으니까) (with Changbin)	2022	—	—	—	—	—	—	SKZ-Replay
"Up All Night" (오늘 밤 나는 불을 켜) (with Bang Chan, Changbin, and Seungmin)	2022	—	—	—	—	—	—	SKZ-Replay
"Snain" (비바람) (with Changbin and Seungmin)	2023	—	—	—	—	—	—	Non-album single (Note: Released only on YouTube as part of SKZ-Record project.)
"Unfair"	2024	20	—	18	—	—	—	Hop
"Truman" (with Han)	2025	140	86	22	33	7	—	Mixtape: Dominate
"Rev It Up"	2026	109	—	—	—	—	—	SKZ-Replay 2026 Pt.1
"Slow It Down"	2026	—	12	—	—	—	—	Non-album single
"—" denotes releases that did not chart or were not released in that region.

==== As featured artist ====
List of songs, showing year released, selected chart positions, and name of the album
Title	Year	Peak chart positions								Album
Title	Year	KOR DL	HUN	JPN Cmb.	JPN Hot	NZ Hot	SGP Reg.	US World	WW Excl. JPN	Album
"No Problem" (Nayeon featuring Felix)	2022	31	30	—	—	—	25	10	—	Im Nayeon
"ReawakeR" (Lisa featuring Felix)	2025	—	—	29	56	38	—	1	1	Lace Up
"—" denotes releases that did not chart or were not released in that region.

=== Soundtrack appearances ===
Title	Year	Peak chart positions		Album
Title	Year	KOR	US World	Album
"Genie" (with Han and I.N)	2025	— (Note: "Genie" did not chart on the Circle Digital Chart but peaked at number 147 on the Download Chart.)	4	Genie, Make a Wish OST Part.1

=== Songwriting credits ===
All song credits are adapted from KOMCA, unless stated otherwise.

Year	Song Title	Artist	Album	Lyrics		Music	
Year	Song Title	Artist	Album	Credit	With	Credit	With
2018	"Glow"	Stray Kids	Mixtape	Yes	Changbin, Lee Know	No	—N/a
2018	"Mixtape #1"	Stray Kids	I Am Not (Note: Later in 2019 the song included in album Clé 2: Yellow Wood)	Yes	Bang Chan, Changbin, Han, Hyunjin, Lee Know, Seungmin, Woojin, (Note: Later in 2021 the song got revised and remastered then rereleased with different title for album SKZ2021, therefore Woojin's name got removed from the credit) I.N	No	—N/a
2018	"Who"	Stray Kids	I Am Who	Yes	Han, Woojin	Yes	Han, Woojin, Han Jisung
2018	"Mixtape #2"	Stray Kids	I Am Who	Yes	Bang Chan, Changbin, Han, Hyunjin, Lee Know, Seungmin, Woojin, I.N	Yes	Bang Chan, Changbin, Han, Hyunjin, Lee Know, Seungmin, Woojin, I.N
2018	"Mixtape #3"	Stray Kids	I Am You	Yes	Bang Chan, Changbin, Han, Hyunjin, Lee Know, Seungmin, Woojin, I.N	Yes	Bang Chan, Changbin, Han, Hyunjin, Lee Know, Seungmin, Woojin, I.N
2019	"Mixtape #4"	Stray Kids	Clé 1: Miroh	Yes	Bang Chan, Changbin, Han, Hyunjin, Lee Know, Seungmin, Woojin, I.N	Yes	Bang Chan, Changbin, Han, Hyunjin, Lee Know, Seungmin, Woojin, I.N
2019	"Mixtape #5"	Stray Kids	Clé: Levanter (Note: a Physical EP bonus track in the album)	Yes	Bang Chan, Changbin, Han, Hyunjin, Lee Know, Seungmin, I.N	Yes	Bang Chan, Changbin, Han, Hyunjin, Lee Know, Seungmin, I.N
2019	"Wow"	Lee Know, Hyunjin, Felix	In Life	Yes	Andreas Ringblom, Christopher Wortley, Felix, Hyunjin, Kass, Lee Know, Massimo Del Gaudio	No	—N/a
2021	"Because" (좋으니까)	Changbin, Felix	SKZ-Replay	Yes	Changbin	No	—N/a
2021	"Surfin"	Lee Know, Changbin, Felix	Noeasy	Yes	Changbin, Felix, Lee Know, Versachoi	Yes	Versachoi
2021	"Placebo"	Stray Kids	SKZ2021	Yes	Bang Chan, Changbin, Han, Hyunjin, Lee Know, Seungmin, I.N	Yes	Bang Chan, Changbin, Han, Hyunjin, Lee Know, Seungmin, I.N
2021	"Behind The Light" (그림자도빛이있어야존재)	Stray Kids	SKZ2021	Yes	Bang Chan, Changbin, Han, Hyunjin, Lee Know, Seungmin, I.N	Yes	Bang Chan, Changbin, Han, Hyunjin, Lee Know, Seungmin, I.N
2021	"For You"	Stray Kids	SKZ2021	Yes	Bang Chan, Changbin, Han, Hyunjin, Lee Know, Seungmin, I.N	Yes	Bang Chan, Changbin, Han, Hyunjin, Lee Know, Seungmin, I.N
2021	"Hoodie Season"	Stray Kids	SKZ2021	Yes	Bang Chan, Changbin, Han, Hyunjin, Lee Know, Seungmin, I.N	Yes	Bang Chan, Changbin, Han, Hyunjin, Lee Know, Seungmin, I.N
2021	"Broken Compass" (고장난나침반)	Stray Kids	SKZ2021	Yes	Bang Chan, Changbin, Han, Hyunjin, Lee Know, Seungmin, I.N	Yes	Bang Chan, Changbin, Han, Hyunjin, Lee Know, Seungmin, I.N
2021	"#Lovestay"	Stray Kids	SKZ-Replay	Yes	Hyunjin, I.N	No	—N/a
2022	"Muddy Water"	Changbin, Hyunjin, Han, Felix	Oddinary	Yes	Changbin, Felix, Han, Hyunjin, Millionboy	Yes	Millionboy, Bang Chan
2022	"Taste"	Lee Know, Hyunjin, Felix	Maxident	Yes	Hyunjin, Felix, Lee Know	Yes	Bang Chan, Versachoi
2022	"Deep End"	Felix	SKZ-Replay	Yes	Felix	Yes	Felix, Shim Eunjee
2023	"FNF"	Stray Kids	5-Star	Yes	Bang Chan, Felix, Trippy	Yes	Bang Chan, Trippy
2023	"Superbowl"	Stray Kids	5-Star	Yes	Bang Chan, Changbin, Han	No	—N/a
2023	"Rev It Up"	Felix	SKZ-Replay 2026 Pt.1	Yes	Felix	Yes	Versachoi, Bang Chan
2024	"Runners"	Stray Kids	Ate	Yes	Bang Chan	Yes	Bang Chan, Versachoi
2024	"Unfair"	Felix	Hop	Yes	—N/a	Yes	Versachoi
2025	"Truman"	Han, Felix	Mixtape: Dominate	Yes	Han, Felix	Yes	Vendors (Helixx), Peach.L, Han

== Filmography ==
=== Television shows ===
Year	Title	Role	Notes	Ref.
2017	Stray Kids	Contestant	Debuted with Stray Kids	
2019–2020	Pops in Seoul	Host		

=== Web shows ===
Year	Title	Role	Ref.
2025–present	Fridge Interview	Special host	

== Videography ==
=== Music videos ===
List of music videos, showing year released, artist and name of the album
Title	Year	Artist(s)	Ref.
"Heartris"	2023	NiziU	
"Unfair"	2024	Felix	
"Reawaker"	2025	Lisa featuring Felix	

== Awards and nominations ==
Name of the award ceremony, year presented, award category, nominee(s) of the award, and the result of the nomination
Award ceremony	Year	Category	Nominee(s)/work(s)	Result	Ref.
Asia Artist Awards	2025	Grand Presence of K-Pop	Himself	Won	
Asian Pop Music Awards	2025	Best Collaboration	"Reawaker"	Nominated	
Crunchyroll Anime Awards	2026	Best Anime Song	"Reawaker"	Nominated	
Crunchyroll Anime Awards	2026	Best Opening Sequence	"Reawaker"	Nominated	
K-World Dream Awards	2026	Male Solo Popularity Award	Himself	Pending	
Korea Grand Music Awards	2026	K-Wave Popularity	Himself	Pending	
Music Awards Japan	2026	Best Global Hit from Japan	"Reawaker"	Nominated	
Music Awards Japan	2026	Best Cross-Over Collaboration Song	"Reawaker"	Nominated	
Music Awards Japan	2026	Best Japanese Song in Europe	"Reawaker"	Nominated	
