= Lee Know =

South Korean singer and dancer (born 1998)

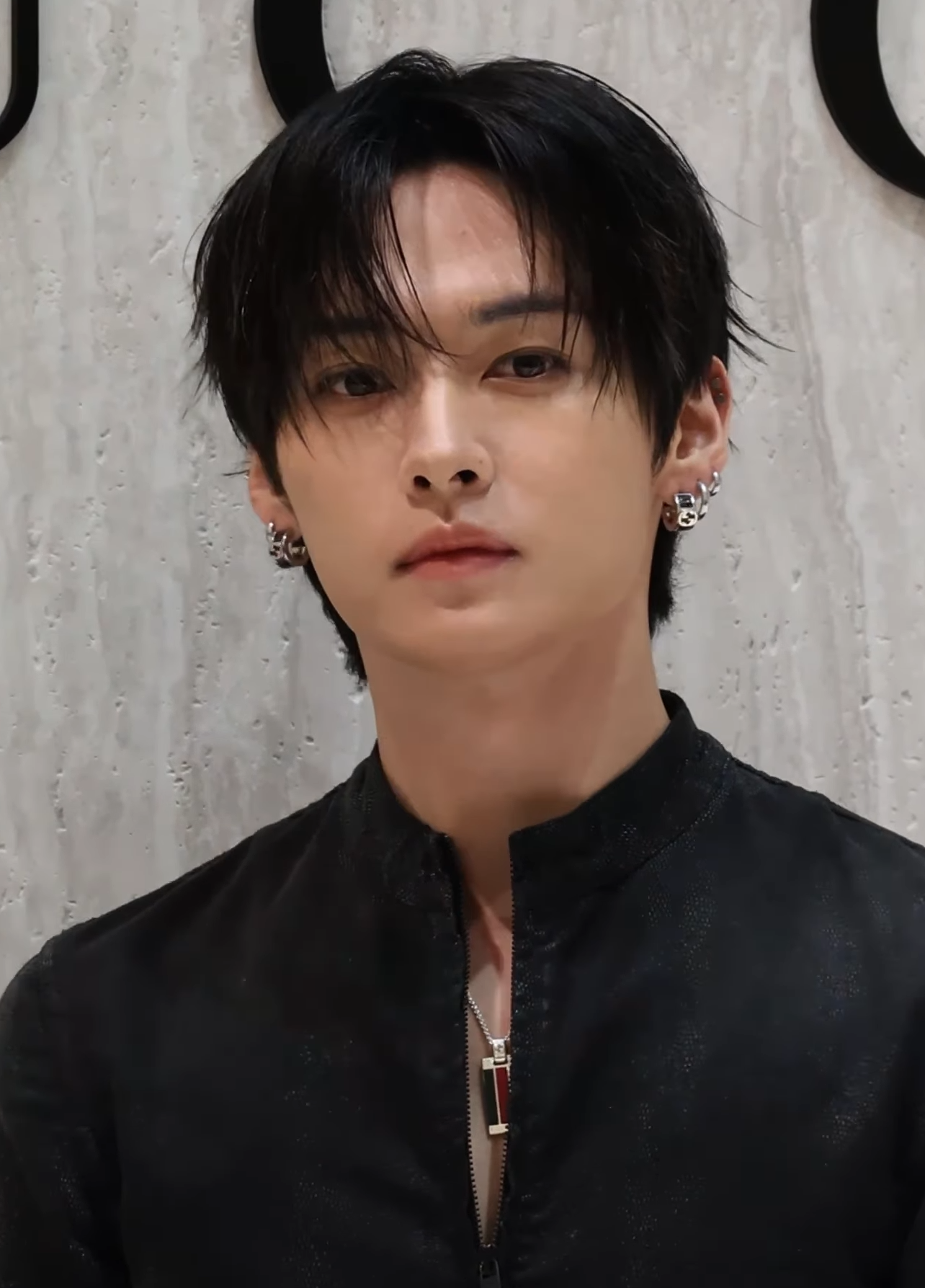
- Lee Know in 2026
- Born: Lee Min-ho; October 25, 1998 (age 28); Gimpo, Gyeonggi Province, South Korea
- Occupations: Singer; dancer
- Musical career
- Genre: K-pop
- Instrument: Vocals
- Years active: 2017–present
- Label: JYP
- Member of: Stray Kids

Korean name
- Hangul: 이민호
- RR: I Minho
- MR: I Minho

Stage name
- Hangul: 리노
- RR: Rino
- MR: Rino

Lee Min-ho (Korean: 이민호; born October 25, 1998), better known by his stage name Lee Know (리노), is a South Korean singer and dancer. He is a member of South Korean boy band Stray Kids, formed by JYP Entertainment in 2017.

In addition to his work with Stray Kids, Lee Know served as a host for the music chart show, Show! Music Core, from 2021 to 2023, and serves as a global ambassador for Gucci.

== Early life ==
Lee Min-ho was born in Gimpo, Gyeonggi Province, South Korea and is an only child. He started dancing in middle school, after seeing a dance video online. He took lessons for five years before becoming a trainee. Lee Know graduated from Gimpo Jeil Technical High School. He practiced martial arts as a child and has a second degree black belt in taekwondo and mixed martial arts.

After debuting, along with bandmates Changbin and Han, Lee Know enrolled at Gukje Cyber University, studying performance and broadcast entertainment.

== Career ==
=== 2015–2017: Pre-debut and survival show ===
Lee Know competed in dance competitions (performing with the crew 'Cupcakes' at World of Dance in 2016) and pursued work as a professional dancer. He was also a back up dancer for K-Pop group BTS, appearing in the 2017 music video for "Not Today" and several of their performances, as well as touring with them on their 2017 The Wings Tour.

After being seen at a dance competition, JYP called him in 2015 and asked him to come to an audition. Lee Know auditioned with the song "Thought of You" by John Park, but after hearing nothing back, he assumed he had failed. However, a couple of years later, he received a call and was asked to join the company.

Lee Know joined JYP on July 16, 2017, making him the last Stray Kids member to do so. Lee Know participated on the survival show Stray Kids and was eliminated on the fourth episode for making an error while rapping. Ultimately, Lee Know and Felix, who were both eliminated, were allowed to be back and debut with the group in the last episode of the show. Their pre-debut EP Mixtape was released January 2018. Stray Kids officially debuted on March 25, 2018, with the EP I Am Not.

=== 2017–present: Debut with Stray Kids and solo activities ===
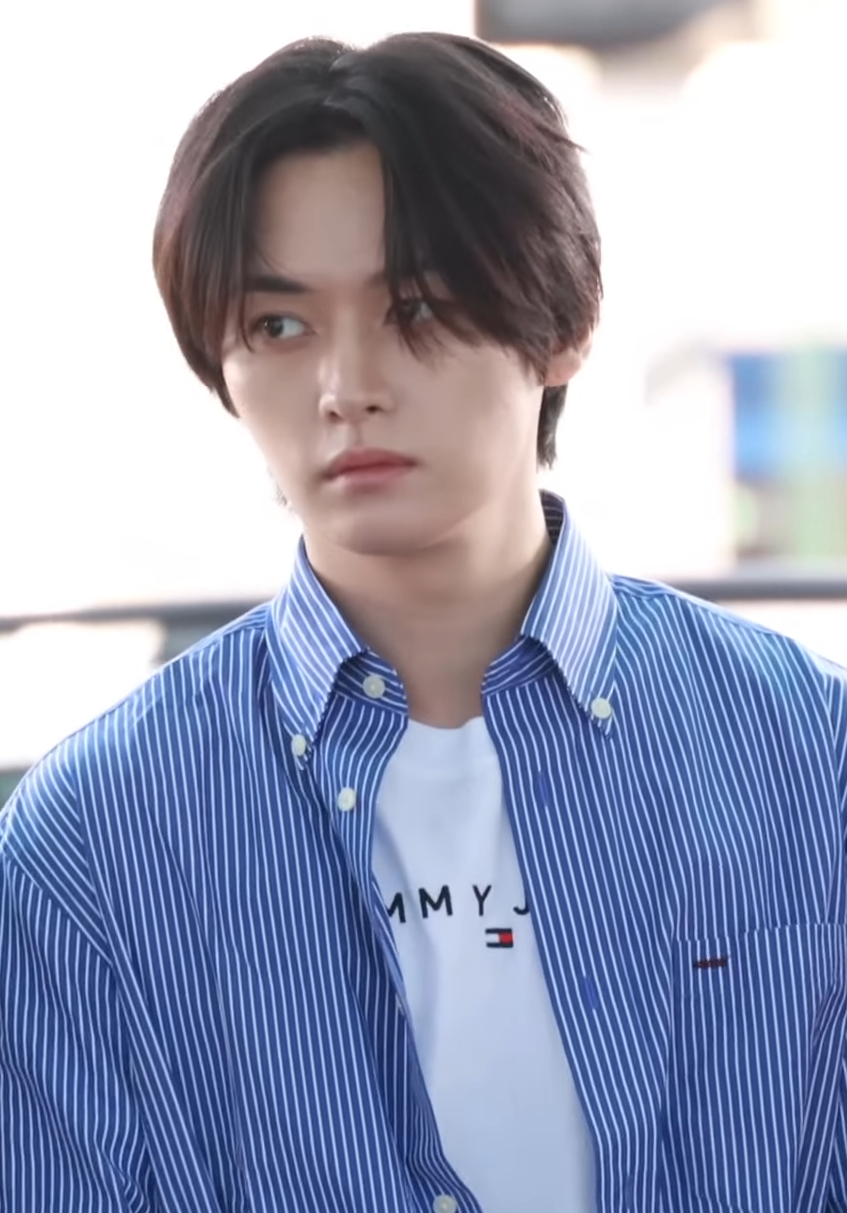
Lee Know in May 2024

Lee Know has contributed both vocals and rap to Stray Kids' songs, and is a main dancer.

He has also worked as a television presenter, including as a special MC for Show Champion, and in August 2021, Lee Know joined Minju as the new host of MBC's Show! Music Core alongside Jungwoo of NCT. Later that year, he was nominated alongside his co-hosts for the 2021 MBC Entertainment Awards Rookie Award.

In October 2021, he was a guest on EBS1's Best Cooking Secrets.

In December 2021, Lee Know - as an idol born in a year of the tiger - was invited to perform a special dance stage to SuperM's "Tiger Inside".

==== SKZ-Record/Player and solo music ====
After debuting, Stray Kids began a YouTube-based non-album singles project, SKZ-Record/Player; as of July 2025, Lee Know has contributed a wide variety of pieces to the project, including original solo songs, original sub-unit songs, cover versions, and dance performances.

These include "Dawn", a dance he choreographed with Vio Kim (from Team Magnolia) and Jeong Wookjin, his solo song "Limbo", the collaboration song "Drive" (with Bang Chan), "Want So Bad", a duet with bandmate Han; and a cover of Day6's "Love Me or Leave Me".

Both Drive and Limbo were released to digital platforms as part of Stray Kids' digital compilation album, SKZ-Replay, in December 2022.

In 2024, Lee Know performed his unreleased solo track, "Youth," during the Dominate World Tour. The song was later included in Hop, the group's album released on December 13.

On April 8, 2025, it was reported that Lee Know, together with his bandmates Seungmin and I.N, would be appearing on the soundtrack of tvN's medical drama, Resident Playbook. The trio's song, "Start!", was released as part one of the original soundtrack on April 12, 2025.

== Artistry ==
In 2024, Lee Know was ranked 3rd on Billboard's K-Pop Artist 100 chart. Together with Hyunjin and Felix, Lee Know forms Stray Kids' primary dance trio, popularly dubbed DanceRacha. The name derives from 3Racha, a reference to the group’s established production trio.

Having danced professionally prior to his debut with Stray Kids, Lee Know's technical precision and ability to match his energy and movement to a song in detail have been praised. His skills gave rise to the nickname "dancing gem", and in reviewing Stray Kids' 2023 appearance at BST Hyde Park, Rolling Stone UK praised Lee Know's "silky" moves.

Lee Know is also considered to have quality, characterful vocals and strong rap skills. In 2024, he appeared on LeeMujin Service, where he performed the Stray Kids B-side "twilight", "You to Me, Again" by Byun Jin-sub, "Only One" by BoA, and "The One I Cannot Have" by Bank.

== Other ventures ==
=== Fashion ===
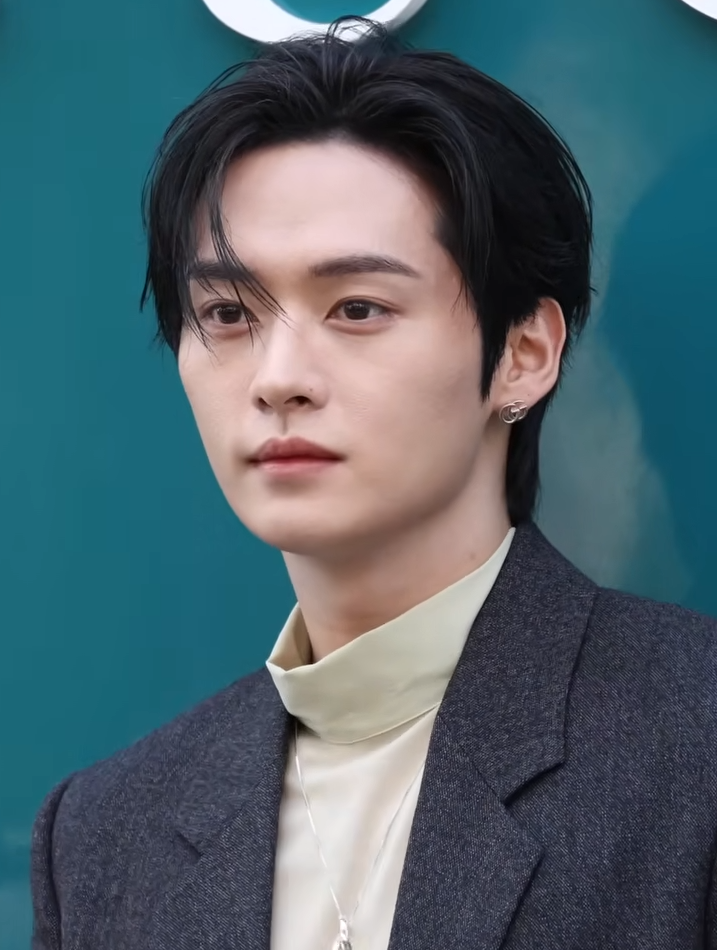
Lee Know at the Gucci Osteria event in Seoul, September 2025

Lee Know has been referred to as having "sculptural", "film star" good looks, and has done photo shoots for several fashion companies, including Gucci.

Together with bandmate and fellow DanceRacha member Hyunjin, Lee Know featured in the April 2020 issue of Arena Homme+ Korea. He appeared in a campaign for Etro's "Earth Beat" sneakers in 2021.

In May 2024, Lee Know made his Met Gala debut with Stray Kids as the guest of Tommy Hilfiger. He has appeared on the covers of fashion magazines including W Korea and Beauty+. Lee Know, along with bandmate Felix, made their New York Fashion Week debut at the Tommy Hilfiger Spring-Summer 2025 show in September 2024 as a guest.

In February 2026, Lee Know appeared on his first Japanese solo cover for the April issue of Nylon Japan, featuring a 26-page spread in collaboration with the French jewelry house Boucheron. Following this, in April 2026, he was featured on the cover of Marie Claire Korea for their May issue, representing Chaumet's "Bee My Love" collection through a series of pictorials and films. In September, he was chosen as the 2026 fall/winter season ambassador for South Korean fashion house Matin Kim.

==== Gucci ambassadorship ====
Lee Know was reportedly invited to Sabato de Sarno's debut show for Gucci on September 22, 2023. Still, he was unable to attend due to a car accident. In May 2024, he attended Gucci's 2025 Cruise fashion show as a guest in London.

In June 2025, Gucci announced Lee Know as its new brand ambassador, citing his "individuality and artistic spirit" as resonating with the label's ideas and evolution. Lee Know modeled for the brand twice in 2025, appearing on the cover of the August issue of Esquire Korea and the November issue of Harper's Bazaar Korea. On February 27, 2026, Lee Know made his solo debut at Milan Fashion Week as a brand guest, attending Gucci's Fall 2026 women's fashion show.

=== Philanthropy ===
On February 28, 2024, World Vision announced that Lee Know became the youngest person to be inducted into their "Bob Pierce Honor Club" for donating over ₩100 million (equivalent to ₩102.12 million or US$76,195.57 in 2025) to the charity. Lee Know also sponsors four children through the same charity.

On October 25, 2025, his 27th birthday, Lee Know donated ₩200 million (US$149,223), with ₩100 million (US$74,611.5) each to Samsung Medical Center and the cat protection group Nabiya Saranghae. The donation will support the treatment of patients undergoing treatment at Samsung Medical Center, as well as support abandoned cats run by Nabiya Saranghae.

On August 30, 2026, Lee Know donated ₩100 million (US$74,611.5) to World Vision to support people affected by 2026 floods in Nepal.

=== Television ===
Starting in August 2021, Lee Know was an MC on Show! Music Core until October 2023, fulfilling the standard two-year contract. He also appeared on multiple television shows: The Fishermen and the City, Idol Dictation Contest, and Idol on Quiz.

== Personal life ==
In September 2023, Lee Know and fellow Stray Kids members Seungmin and Hyunjin were involved in a car accident, causing them to miss their performance at the Global Citizen Festival, though they sustained no serious injuries.

Lee Know is a cat lover and has three cats, Soonie, Doongie, and Dori. He enjoys cinema, naming the Japanese romantic drama My Tomorrow, Your Yesterday one of his favorite films.

On November 6, 2026, JYP announced that Lee Know will enlist for his mandatory military service in the first quarter of 2027.

== Discography ==
=== Songs ===
List of songs, with selected chart positions, showing year released and album name
Title	Year	Peak chart positions					Album
Title	Year	KOR DL	JPN DL	NZ Hot	UK Sales	US World	Album
"Not!" (with Bang Chan and Seungmin)	2018	—	—	—	—	—	I Am Not
"Wow" (with Felix and Hyunjin)	2020	—	—	—	—	12	In Life
"Surfin'" (with Felix and Changbin)	2021	29	—	—	—	—	Noeasy
"Waiting for Us" (피어난다) (with Bang Chan, Seungmin, and I.N)	2022	25	—	—	—	—	Oddinary
"Taste" (with Felix and Hyunjin)	2022	32	—	23	—	9	Maxident
"Limbo" (나지막이) (Note: credited to Stray Kids, but the track is a solo by Lee Know)	2022	150	—	—	—	—	SKZ-Replay
"Drive" (with Bang Chan)	2022	—	—	—	—	—	SKZ-Replay
"Want so Bad" (Note: "Want so Bad" released only on YouTube and YouTube Music as part of SKZ-Record project.) (with Han)	2023	—	—	—	—	—	Non-album song
"Youth"	2024	25	—	—	—	—	Hop
"Cinema" (with Seungmin)	2025	141	52	31	47	2	Mixtape: Dominate
"—" denotes releases that did not chart or were not released in that region.

=== Soundtrack appearances ===
List of soundtrack appearances, with selected chart positions, showing year released and album title
Title	Year	Peak	Album
Title	Year	KOR	Album
"Start!" (with Seungmin and I.N)	2025	— (Note: "Start!" did not chart on the Circle Digital Chart, but peaked at position 58, 87, and 36 on components Download, BGM, and V Coloring Chart, respectively.)	Resident Playbook OST Part.1
"—" denotes releases that did not chart or were not released in that region.

=== Songwriting credits ===
All song credits are adapted from KOMCA, unless stated otherwise.

Year	Song title	Artist	Album	Lyrics		Music	
Year	Song title	Artist	Album	Credit	With	Credit	With
2018	"Glow"	Stray Kids	Mixtape	No		Yes	Lim Jung-suk, Bang Chan
2018	"Mixtape #1"	Stray Kids	I Am Not (Note: Later in 2019 the song included in album Clé 2: Yellow Wood)	Yes	Bang Chan, Changbin, Han, Hyunjin, Seungmin, Woojin, (Note: Later in 2021 the song got revised and remastered then rereleased with different title for album SKZ2021, therefore Woojin's name got removed from the credit) I.N, Felix	No	
2018	"Mixtape #2"	Stray Kids	I Am Who	Yes	Bang Chan, Changbin, Han, Hyunjin, Seungmin, Woojin, I.N, Felix	Yes	Bang Chan, Changbin, Han, Hyunjin, Seungmin, Woojin, I.N, Felix
2018	"Mixtape #3"	Stray Kids	I Am You	Yes	Bang Chan, Changbin, Han, Hyunjin, Seungmin, Woojin, I.N, Felix	Yes	Bang Chan, Changbin, Han, Hyunjin, Seungmin, Woojin, I.N, Felix
2019	"Mixtape #4"	Stray Kids	Clé 1: Miroh	Yes	Bang Chan, Changbin, Han, Hyunjin, Seungmin, Woojin, I.N, Felix	Yes	Bang Chan, Changbin, Han, Hyunjin, Seungmin, Woojin, I.N, Felix
2019	"Mixtape #5"	Stray Kids	Clé: Levanter (Note: a Physical EP bonus track in the album)	Yes	Bang Chan, Changbin, Han, Hyunjin, Seungmin, I.N, Felix	Yes	Bang Chan, Changbin, Han, Hyunjin, Seungmin, I.N, Felix
2019	"Wow"	Lee Know, Hyunjin, Felix	In Life	Yes	Kass, Hyunjin, Felix	No	
2021	"Drive"	Bang Chan, Lee Know	SKZ-Replay	Yes	Bang Chan	No	
2021	"Surfin"	Lee Know, Changbin, Felix	Noeasy	Yes	Changbin, Felix	Yes	Versachoi, Changbin, Felix
2021	"Placebo"	Stray Kids	SKZ2021	Yes	Bang Chan, Changbin, Han, Hyunjin, Seungmin, I.N, Felix	Yes	Bang Chan, Changbin, Han, Hyunjin, Seungmin, I.N, Felix
2021	"Behind The Light" (그림자도빛이있어야존재)	Stray Kids	SKZ2021	Yes	Bang Chan, Changbin, Han, Hyunjin, Seungmin, I.N, Felix	Yes	Bang Chan, Changbin, Han, Hyunjin, Seungmin, I.N, Felix
2021	"For You"	Stray Kids	SKZ2021	Yes	Bang Chan, Changbin, Han, Hyunjin, Seungmin, I.N, Felix	Yes	Bang Chan, Changbin, Han, Hyunjin, Seungmin, I.N, Felix
2021	"Hoodie Season"	Stray Kids	SKZ2021	Yes	Bang Chan, Changbin, Han, Hyunjin, Seungmin, I.N, Felix	Yes	Bang Chan, Changbin, Han, Hyunjin, Seungmin, I.N, Felix
2021	"Broken Compass" (고장난나침반)	Stray Kids	SKZ2021	Yes	Bang Chan, Changbin, Han, Hyunjin, Seungmin, I.N, Felix	Yes	Bang Chan, Changbin, Han, Hyunjin, Seungmin, I.N, Felix
2022	"Waiting for Us" (피어난다)	Bang Chan, Lee Know, Seungmin, I.N	Oddinary	Yes	Bang Chan, Seungmin, I.N	Yes	Bang Chan, Seungmin, I.N, Nickko Young
2022	"Taste"	Lee Know, Hyunjin, Felix	Maxident	Yes	Hyunjin, Felix	Yes	Bang Chan, Hyunjin, Felix
2022	"Limbo" (나지막이)	Lee Know	SKZ-Replay	Yes	Hotsauce	Yes	Hotsauce
2024	"Youth"	Lee Know	Hop	Yes	Danke, Bang Hye-hyeon	No	
2025	"Cinema"	Lee Know, Seungmin	Mixtape: Dominate	Yes	Seungmin	No	

== Videography ==
=== Music videos ===
List of music videos, showing year released, artist and name of the album
Title	Year	Artist(s)	Album	Ref.
"Youth"	2024	Lee Know	Hop	
"Cinema"	2025	Lee Know, Seungmin	Mixtape: Dominate	
"Start!"	2025	Lee Know, Seungmin, I.N	Resident Playbook OST Part.1	

=== Music video appearances ===
Year	Title	Artist	Note	Ref.
2017	"Not Today"	BTS	Backup dancer	

== Filmography ==
=== Television ===
List of TV show featuring Lee Know, showing year aired, his role, and notes
Year(s)	Show	Role	Notes	Ref.
2017	Stray Kids	Contestant	Debuted with Stray Kids	
2019	Show Champion	Special MC	Episode 312	
2021	The Fishermen and the City	Contestant	Winner of the contest	
2021	Idol Dictation Contest	Panelist		
2021–2023	Show! Music Core	MC	with Jungwoo	

== Awards and nominations ==
Name of the award ceremony, year presented, category, nominee of the award, and the result of the nomination
Award ceremony	Year	Category	Nominee / Work	Result	Ref.
MBC Entertainment Awards	2021	Rookie Award	Show! Music Core	Nominated	
