= Stray Kids (TV program) =

South Korean television program

- Promotional poster
- Hangul: 스트레이 키즈
- RR: Seuteurei kijeu
- MR: Sŭt'ŭrei k'ijŭ
- Created by: JYP Entertainment
- Presented by: Park Jin-young
- Country of origin: South Korea
- Original language: Korean
- No. of seasons: 1
- No. of episodes: 10

Production
- Running time: 60 minutes; 90 minutes (finale)
- Production companies: JYP Entertainment; CJ E&M; Studio Take One

Original release
- Network: Mnet
- Release: October 17 – December 19, 2017

Related
- Sixteen

Stray Kids (Korean: 스트레이 키즈) is a 2017 reality show created by JYP Entertainment and Mnet. It was created as a male idol debut project with the concept of "trainees versus JYP", the goal of which being the survival of all nine members to debut as a team. It was broadcast on Mnet from October 17 to December 19, 2017, on Tuesdays at 23:00 (KST) timeslot for ten episodes.

== Background and concept ==
In late July 2017, it was reported that JYP Entertainment (JYPE), was set to premiere a new season of their 2015 reality show Sixteen — which debuted Twice — in the second half of the year. However, it was revealed the next month that the agency would launch a male idol debut project with a completely different concept from Sixteen. The show began airing in October 2017 and the line up of the group was finalized in December, with the group having their official debut showcase in March 2018.

Rather than individuals surviving to form a team, the team was pre-selected and trainees would perform self-composed songs, working towards the goal of debuting together. They were judged based on individual abilities and teamwork through various missions. The show also featured the behind-the-scenes look at the daily lives of trainees and their yearly showcase held in August.

On September 21, JYPE revealed the show's title, Stray Kids, along with its logo and social media channels. Featuring the originally nine members, now eight members, the first image teaser was unveiled on October 9.

== Original songs ==
Over the course of the 10-episode series, the members were tasked with writing original music as part of their missions. Each song was later released on their pre-debut EP Mixtape.

List of songs by first appearance
Episode	Song	Credits			Choreography
Episode	Song	Lyrics	Composition	Arrangement	Choreography
2	"Hellevator"	Armadillo; 3racha	Armadillo; 3racha Rangga	Armadillo; Bang Chan; Rangga	Na Tae-hoon, Ryu.D, Ali, Chris Martin
4	"4419"	3racha Seungmin; Hyunjin	3racha RealBros	RealBros	Yoo Gwang-yeol
4	"Glow"	Changbin; Lee Know; Felix	Bang Chan	Bang Chan; Garden	Ali
4	"School Life"	3racha Woojin; I.N; Maeel	Han; Woojin; Brandon P. Lowry; Tobias Karlsson; Matthew Engst	Brandon P. Lowry; Tobias Karlsson; Matthew Engst	Na Tae-hoon, Kim Hyung-woong
8	"Yayaya"	Earattack; 3racha	Earattack; 3racha	Earattack; 5$ Frants	Ali
10	"Spread My Wings" (어린 날개)	3racha	3racha Trippy	Trippy	Na Tae-hoon, Ali
10	"Beware" (Grrr 총량의 법칙)	3racha	3racha Trippy; 1 Take	Trippy	Kim Hyung-woong, Ali

=== "Hellevator" ===
On September 26, 2017, a music video teaser of a song titled "Hellevator" was uploaded online. The full version was scheduled to be released on October 3 but was pushed back to the 6th. The song, co-composed and co-written by 3Racha, was later released as a digital single on November 1.

== Contestants ==
Name	Hangul	Birth date	Notes
Kim Woojin	김우진	April 8, 1997	He used to be a trainee under SM Entertainment and trained alongside the future members of NCT.
Bang Chan	방찬	October 3, 1997	The group's leader; he joined JYPE in 2010 after passing an audition in Australia. He used to train with the members of Got7, Day6 and Twice.
Lee Min-ho	이민호	October 25, 1998	A dancer of 4–5 years and was once one of the dancers for BTS's concert tour.
Seo Chang-bin	서창빈	August 11, 1999	A trainee for two years at the time of the show's premiere.
Hwang Hyun-jin	황현진	March 20, 2000	A trainee for two years at the time of the show's premiere.
Han Ji-sung	한지성	September 14, 2000	He used to live and study in Malaysia.
Lee Felix	이용복	September 15, 2000	Like Chan, he joined JYPE after passing an audition in Australia, where he was born and raised.
Kim Seung-min	김승민	September 22, 2000	Joined the company in 2016 after winning second place in JYPE 13th Open Audition.
Yang Jeong-in	양정인	February 8, 2001	The youngest of the trainees; he was born in Busan.

=== 3Racha ===
Bang Chan, Seo Chang-bin and Han Ji-sung are part of a pre-debut group called 3Racha. The trio released several self-composed mixtapes that were uploaded online.

== Episodes ==
=== Episode 1 (October 17, 2017) ===
In the first episode, JYPE decides to select the new debut group by having two teams compete. The female trainees form a team called 2team, consisting of Yeji, Ryujin, Chaeryeong, and Yuna, all chosen by the agency. The male trainees form the Male Project Team, created by long-time trainee Bang Chan, which includes Bang Chan, Kim Woo-jin, Lee Min-ho, Seo Chang-bin, Hwang Hyun-jin, Han Ji-sung, Lee Felix, Kim Seung-min, and Yang Jeong-in. Both teams perform at the trainee showcase and receive positive feedback. However, Park Jin-young ultimately selects the Male Project Team as the winning group with their performance of the song "Warrior's Descendant" by H.O.T.

=== Episode 2 (October 24, 2017) ===
The first mission is revealed; the nine members of the Male Project Team are challenged to compose their own song, as well as perform it, to determine if they can debut altogether without eliminations. One week prior to their performance, the members living outside the dorms move in. After they settle in, the group goes to the arcade to spend some free time. At the JYPE Training Center, the group selects the track they will use for the mission evaluation and starts practicing. On the day of the evaluation, the group announces their name, Stray Kids, and their song titled "Hellevator." After the performance, Park praises the song's lyrics, arrangement and melody, but mentions that the key is too high for male singers. He also notes that there are members who did not meet Park's standards and expectations, which leads to an elimination round.

=== Episode 3 (October 31, 2017) ===
Min-ho, Jeong-in and Hyun-jin are at risk of elimination. After giving criticisms, Park re-arranges the members' parts in "Hellevator." For the next mission evaluation, they are tasked to divide the group into three teams for "3:3:3" stage performances. The members decide their own teammates: Min-ho picks Felix and Chang-bin, Hyun-jin picks Seung-min and Chan, and Jeong-in picks Woo-jin and Ji-sung. Five days prior, the teams spend a day off. Min-ho's team have a picnic at Hangang Park, Hyun-jin's team goes to a bowling center, and Jeong-in's team heads to a karaoke room. During the episode, the behind-the-scenes filming for the music video of "Hellevator" is also shown.

=== Episode 4 (November 7, 2017) ===
The three teams show their performances to other members for comments and advice. During the second mission evaluation, Hyun-jin's team is first, performing a song titled "4419," which is based on Bang Chan's experiences while riding bus No. 4419 as a trainee in Seoul. Park praises their overall performance. Min-ho's team next performs a song titled "Glow," lyrically about a hardworking team who is practicing until dawn. Chang-bin receives compliments but Felix gets criticized for being unconfident, while Min-ho mixes up his lyrics while performing. Jeong-in's team performs "School Life," a song about students' days and slight rebellion. Ji-sung and Woo-jin both receive compliments, though Park points out their lack of stage presence and dancing skills respectively. Jeong-in is criticized for his rap and dance skills. Jeong-in, Felix and Min-ho are now at risk of getting eliminated. In the end, Min-ho is eliminated from the group.

=== Episode 5 (November 14, 2017) ===
Park remarks that Min-ho's skills are still lacking due to a shorter training period compared to the other members. Stray Kids continues with eight members. A few days after Min-ho's elimination, Park gathers the group for a talk and lesson about things to remember while achieving dreams. Afterwards, the group is given a special vacation in Gangneung. They go to the sea, eat at the central market, and play relay skating at the ice rink. At night, they camp out and chat about the hardest mission they've gone through so far, the person who they are most grateful to, and talk about Min-ho. In the end, they watch a video message that Min-ho has prepared.

=== Episode 6 (November 21, 2017) ===
Park reveals the third mission: "JYP vs. YG", a longtime tradition of putting trainees from the two agencies against each other, like the battle in the 2013 Mnet reality television program Win: Who is Next. A week before the battle, Stray Kids picks their representatives for the vocal, dance and free battle teams. For the vocal team, they are tasked with performing a song by one of YG Entertainment's girl groups. Chan, Woo-jin, Ji-sung, and Jeong-in decide to sing Blackpink's "As If It's Your Last," and remix the song to fit Stray Kids' concept. 3Racha prepares an original rap performance titled "Matryoshka", a rap about staying true to yourself using the motif of Russia's traditional dolls. Park reviews the prepared performances and decides to remove Chan from the rap performance and Jeong-in from the vocal performance.

On the battle day, the team heads to YG Entertainment headquarters where they meet the other agency's trainees for the first time - including Bang Ye-dam from K-pop Star 2. In the free battle round, Chang-bin and Ji-sung perform "Matryoshka" without Chan. Yang Hyun-suk and Park praise their performance. Bang Ye-dam of YG performs Shawn Mendes' "There's Nothing Holdin' Me Back" and receives compliments from Park.

=== Episode 7 (November 28, 2017) ===
Stray Kids' vocal team, excluding Jeong-in, performs "As If It's Your Last" and finishes without any mistakes. Ji-sung and Woo-jin receive praise from Park and Yang. The YG vocal team performs a remix version of Wonder Girls' "Why So Lonely" and receives high praise overall. For the dance battle, Stray Kids performs an original and unique stage, while the YG trainees perform and receive compliments and some tips from Park. A few days after the third mission, Park invites Stray Kids to a brunch, and reveals the next mission — a busking event. They then go to Hongdae, Seoul to research busking. The members prepare for their upcoming busking event while Jeong-in and Felix also practice hard to avoid elimination.

=== Episode 8 (December 5, 2017) ===
Stray Kids' busking event is set to be held in Sinchon. Jun. K of 2PM and Black Eyed Pilseung's Rado are invited to watch the busking as Park's mystery listeners. Got7 members BamBam and Yugyeom and Day6 members Sungjin and Young K also attend the event. Stray Kids performs "Hellevator", "School Life" and a new song titled "YAYAYA". Park criticizes the performances, stating that Chan's vocalization was not stable, Woo-jin could not be recognized as the main vocal and lacks in dancing skill, Hyun-jin's pronunciation was still lacking, and Felix made a dance mistake during "YAYAYA" and his rapping did not stand out because of his difficulty with the Korean language. Hyun-jin, Woo-jin and Felix are chosen for potential elimination. In the end, Felix is eliminated.

=== Episode 9 (December 12, 2017) ===
For the final mission, it is announced by Park that there will be a live broadcast and live audience voting. After the announcement, the team re-organizes their choreography to match the seven members configuration. Chan's longtime friend, BamBam of Got7, visits the JYPE Training Center. They go out to eat together and BamBam gives Chan advice. Meanwhile, some of the members have their vocal lessons; Seung-min performs Shawn Mendes' "Stitches", Woo-jin performs Adam Levine's "Lost Stars" and practices his vocalization, and Jeong-in performs "Impossible" by James Arthur. To practice, Hyun-jin performs "MM" for his rap trainer and Chang-bin helps him vocalize. While the team practices choreography, Got7's JB and Jinyoung visit them at the training center. They give the members advice for the live broadcast and comment on their seven-member version of "YAYAYA." At JYPE headquarters, the team records a new original song titled "Young Wings" with composer 1take. The scene then cuts to a week before the recording; Park calls eliminated members Min-ho and Felix back and gives them a second chance to debut with the group. It is then revealed that the stages on the live broadcast will each have a seven-member version versus a nine-member version, to help determine the final line-up.

=== Episode 10 (December 19, 2017) ===
The live broadcast is held at the CJ E&M Ilsan Studio on December 19, 2017, with Kim Il-joong hosting. A nationwide voting is held to help determine if Stray Kids should debut as a seven-member, or nine-member group. The seven-member version of "YAYAYA" and "Young Wings" is performed first, and Park gives positive remarks for the two stages. Min-ho and Felix join the group to perform the nine-member version of "Hellevator," "School Life," and a new upbeat song titled "Grrr." Jun. K of 2PM performs a special stage as well. The live vote ends with 96% of voters in favor of the nine-member group. Park remarks that the performance feels more lively with all nine members, and confirms that they will debut as such.

== Episode progress ==
Contestants	Episodes									
Contestants	1	2	3	4	5	6	7	8	9	10
Woojin	WIN	SAFE	SAFE	SAFE	SAFE	SAFE	SAFE	BTM 3	SAFE	DEBUTED
Bang Chan	WIN	SAFE	SAFE	SAFE	SAFE	SAFE	SAFE	SAFE	SAFE	DEBUTED
Changbin	WIN	SAFE	SAFE	SAFE	SAFE	SAFE	SAFE	SAFE	SAFE	DEBUTED
Hyunjin	WIN	SAFE	BTM 3	SAFE	SAFE	SAFE	SAFE	BTM 3	SAFE	DEBUTED
Jisung	WIN	SAFE	SAFE	SAFE	SAFE	SAFE	SAFE	SAFE	SAFE	DEBUTED
Seungmin	WIN	SAFE	SAFE	SAFE	SAFE	SAFE	SAFE	SAFE	SAFE	DEBUTED
Jeongin	WIN	SAFE	BTM 3	BTM 3	SAFE	SAFE	SAFE	SAFE	SAFE	DEBUTED
Felix	WIN	SAFE	SAFE	BTM 3	SAFE	SAFE	SAFE	ELIM	RETURN	DEBUTED
Minho	WIN	SAFE	BTM 3	ELIM					RETURN	DEBUTED

=== Elimination ===
Lee Min-ho and Lee Felix were eliminated from the group on the fourth and eighth episode respectively, but were later brought back in the ninth episode.

=== Notes ===
Contestant picked entire team and won with continuing to compete towards debut.
The entire team of contestants won with continuing to compete towards debut.
The contestant is at risk of elimination.
The contestant was eliminated.
The contestant was at risk of being eliminated but was saved.
The contestant returned to the competition.
The contestants have won to debut as 9.

== Result ==
All nine members of Stray Kids officially debuted in March 2018 with the release of their extended play (EP) titled I Am Not. Woojin left the group in 2019, leaving the group to continue as an 8 member group.
