= SKZ-Replay 2026 Pt.1 =

Compilation album by Stray Kids
- Released: August 1, 2026
- Studios: JYPE (Seoul); Channie's "Room" (Seoul); Bake Sound (Seoul)
- Length: 47:03
- Languages: Korean; English
- Labels: JYP; Republic
- Producers: 3Racha; Chae Gang-hae; Frants; Helixx; HotSauce; Joha; Millionboy; Neut; Nickko Young; Restart; Versachoi; Younghood

Stray Kids chronology
Do It (2025)	SKZ-Replay 2026 Pt.1 (2026)	This & That (2026)

Singles from SKZ-Replay 2026 Pt.1
- 1. "Stay" Released: March 25, 2026

SKZ-Replay 2026 Pt.1 is the fourth compilation album by South Korean boy band Stray Kids. It was released through JYP Entertainment and Republic Records on August 1, 2026, to commemorate the eighth anniversary of their official fan club Stay. Similar to SKZ-Replay (2022), the compilation features songs unofficially released from their SKZ-Player and SKZ-Record series from 2025 to 2026, as well as their solo songs performed at the 5-Star Dome Tour in 2023.

== Background ==
SKZ-Player and SKZ-Record are video series by South Korean boy band Stray Kids to showcase their self-written songs and covers. The series is published via online video platforms. SKZ-Player is released as a music video, while SKZ-Record an audio video. The band released their compilation album, SKZ-Replay, in December 2022, which collected SKZ-Player and SKZ-Record from 2018 to 2022, as well as their original songs.

In 2023, most Stray Kids' members debuted their unreleased solo songs at the 5-Star Dome Tour—Bang Chan's "Baby", Changbin's "My Name", Hyunjin's "Mic&Brush", Han's "Don't Say", Felix's "Rev It Up", and Seungmin's "Perfume"—while Lee Know and I.N performed their solo songs from SKZ-Replay—"Limbo" and "Hug Me", respectively. On the same tour, the band performed the Korean version of "Battle Ground" live for the first time at the Seoul shows, originally recorded in Japanese and included on their Japanese-language album The Sound (2023).

In 2025, Bang Chan wrote and performed "Roman Empire" for Italian fashion brand Fendi, for which he is a brand ambassador. Hyunjin surprisingly uploaded a music video for his solo song "Lover" on March 20, 2026, his 26th birthday. The next five days, the band released "Stay" to commemorate the group's eighth anniversary since their debut in 2018.

== Release and promotion ==
On January 1, 2026, Stray Kids uploaded the video "Step Out 2026", outlining their 2025 accomplishments and plans for 2026, including SKZ-Replay. During the pre-release promotion circle of the band's tenth Korean-language EP, This & That, Stray Kids announced "2026 StayWeek" on July 26, to commemorate the eighth anniversary of their official fan club Stay. Its contents include the compilation album SKZ-Replay 2026 Pt.1, set to be released on August 1. The next day, the album's cover artwork and track list were posted.

== Track listing ==
SKZ-Replay 2026 Pt.1 track listing
No.	Title	Lyrics	Music	Arrangement	Length
1.	"Battle Ground" (Korean version)	Bang Chan (3Racha); Changbin (3Racha); Han (3Racha)	Bang Chan; Changbin; Han; Frants	Bang Chan; Frants	3:31
2.	"Roman Empire" (Bang Chan)	Bang Chan	Bang Chan; Taalthechoi^{[a]}	Taalthechoi; Bang Chan	2:47
3.	"Lover" (Hyunjin)	Hyunjin	Hyunjin; Joha	Joha	3:03
4.	"Raining Stars" (유성우; Han)	Han; Vendors (Helixx)	Han; Helixx	Helixx	3:38
5.	"The Little Things" (행복 뭐 별거 없네요; I.N)	Han	Han; Restart; Chae Gang-hae	Restart; Chae Gang-hae	2:52
6.	"Goodbye" (Seungmin)	Bang Chan	Bang Chan; Versachoi	Bang Chan; Versachoi	3:37
7.	"Still Here" (제자리걸음; Seungmin)	Changbin	Changbin; Millionboy; Nickko Young	Millionboy; Nickko Young	3:03
8.	"Into the Current" (급류; Seungmin)	Han	Han; Neut	Neut	4:28
9.	"Mic&Brush" (Hyunjin)	Hyunjin	Hyunjin; Restart; Chae	Restart; Chae	2:07
10.	"Perfume" (Seungmin)	Restart; Seungmin	Restart; Seungmin; Chae	Chae; Restart	2:03
11.	"Baby" (Bang Chan)	Bang Chan	Bang Chan; Versachoi	Bang Chan; Versachoi	2:00
12.	"Don't Say" (Han)	Han	Han; Bang Chan	Bang Chan; Versachoi	2:00
13.	"My Name" (명; Changbin)	Changbin	Changbin; Restart; Chae	Restart; Chae	1:35
14.	"Rev It Up" (Felix)	Felix	Felix; Bang Chan; Versachoi	Bang Chan; Versachoi	1:53
15.	"Limbo" (나지막이; Lee Know) (live)	Lee Know	Lee Know; HotSauce	HotSauce	2:20
16.	"Hug Me" (안아줄게요; I.N) (live)	I.N	I.N; Bang Chan; Nickko Young	Bang Chan; Nickko Young	3:30
17.	"Stay" (별, 빛)	Seungmin; Han	Seungmin; Han; Millionboy; Younghood	Millionboy; Younghood	3:06
Total length:					47:03

Notes

- ^{^[a]} Taalthechoi and Versachoi are different pseudonyms for the same person.

== Credits and personnel ==
Musicians

- Stray Kids – lead vocals (1, 17), background vocals (1)
  - Bang Chan (3Racha) – lead vocals (2, 11), background vocals (2, 11), instruments (1–2, 11–12, 14, 16), computer programming (2, 6, 11–12, 14, 16), vocal direction (1, 6, 12, 14)
  - Lee Know – lead vocals (15)
  - Changbin (3Racha) – lead vocals (13), background vocals (7), vocal direction (1, 7, 13)
  - Hyunjin – lead vocals (3, 9), background vocals (3, 9)
  - Han (3Racha) – lead vocals (4, 12), background vocals (4, 12, 17), vocal direction (1, 5, 17)
  - Felix – lead vocals (14), background vocals (14)
  - Seungmin – lead vocals (6–8, 10), background vocals (6–8, 10, 17), vocal direction (17)
  - I.N – lead vocals (5, 16), background vocals (5)
- Frants – instruments (1), computer programming (1)
- Versachoi / Taalthechoi – instruments (2, 11–12, 14), computer programming (2, 6, 11–12, 14)
- Joha – instruments (3), computer programming (3)
- Vendors (Helixx) – drums (4), bass (4), computer programming (4)
- Vendors (Zenur) – guitar (4)
- Im Young-woo – piano (4)
- Restart – instruments (5, 9–10, 13), computer programming (5, 9–10, 13), vocal direction (9–10, 13)
- Chae Gang-hae – instruments (5, 9–10, 13), computer programming (5, 9–10, 13)
- Ra Gyeong-oe – drums (6), bass (6)
- Millionboy – bass (14), drums (7, 14), piano (7, 14), synthesizer (7, 14), computer programming (7, 14), vocal direction (7)
- Nickko Young – bass (7), drums (7), guitar (7, 14), piano (7), synthesizer (7), instruments (16), computer programming (7, 16), vocal direction (7)
- Neut – computer programming (8)
- Park Jin-young – bass (8)
- Kim Young-hwi – drums (8)
- Jo In-ho – guitar (8)
- Havenochois – piano (8)
- Ekko – chorus (15)
- Kim Wang-joon – bass (15)
- Bang In-jae – guitar (15)
- HotSauce – piano (15), computer programming (15)
- Younghood – computer programming (17)

Technical

- Lee Sang-yeob – recording (1)
- Bang Chan (3Racha) – recording (2, 6, 11–12, 14), digital editing (2, 6, 11–12, 14)
- Kwak Bo-eun – recording (3, 17)
- Vendors (Helixx) – recording (4)
- Choi Hye-jin – recording (5)
- Na Su-min – recording (7–8)
- Restart – recording (9–10), digital editing (9–10)
- Lee Kyeong-won – digital editing (1, 3)
- Louis. K – digital editing (4–5, 7–8, 17), mixing (3–10, 13, 17)
- Goo Hye-jin – digital editing (15–16)
- Yoon Won-kwon – mixing (1–2, 11–12, 14)
- Lee Tae-sub – mixing (15)
- Jeon Boo-yeon – mixing (16)
- Kwon Nam-woo – mastering (all)

Locations

- JYPE Studios – recording (1, 3, 5, 15–17), digital editing (15–16), mixing (15–16)
- Channie's "Room" – recording (2, 6, 11–12, 14), digital editing (2, 6, 11–12, 14)
- Bake Sound – recording (7–8)
- Ritz Lab Studio – digital editing (4–5, 7–8, 17), mixing (3–10, 13, 17)
- MadMiix – mixing (1–2, 11–12, 14)
- 821 Sound Mastering – mastering (all)

== Charts ==
Chart performance for SKZ-Replay 2026 Pt.1
Chart (2026)	Peak position
French Albums (SNEP)	187
Japanese Digital Albums (Oricon)	3
Japanese Hot Albums (Billboard Japan)	46
UK Album Downloads (Official Charts)	17
US World Albums (Billboard)	10

== Release history ==
Release dates and formats for SKZ-Replay 2026 Pt.1
Region	Date	Format	Label	Ref.
Various	March 25, 2026	Digital download; streaming	JYP; Republic	
