= Samsung Medical Center =

Hospital in Seoul, South Korea

Coordinates: 37°29′17.4″N 127°5′7.7″E

- 삼성서울병원
- Formation: 9 November 1994
- Location: South Korea
- President & CEO: Park Seung-woo
- Staff: 7929 (2024)
- Website: https://www.samsunghospital.com/en/

Samsung Medical Center (삼성서울병원; SMC) is a tertiary referral hospital in Gangnam District, Seoul, South Korea, operated by the Samsung Life Public Welfare Foundation. It opened on 9 November 1994 and has served as a teaching hospital of Sungkyunkwan University School of Medicine since 1997. As of 31 December 2024, the hospital operated 1,766 beds and employed 7,929 staff, including 915 physicians and 3,337 nurses. Its major clinical institutes include the Samsung Comprehensive Cancer Center, opened in 2008, and the Heart Vascular Stroke Institute, established in 2014.

The hospital conducts biomedical research through the Research Institute for Future Medicine and has received Stage 7 validation, the highest level, under all four maturity models administered by the Healthcare Information and Management Systems Society (HIMSS). In 2015, the hospital suffered an outbreak of Middle East respiratory syndrome, and was criticised for its poor handling of the incident.

== History ==
Samsung Medical Center was established by the Samsung Life Public Welfare Foundation and opened in Seoul on 9 November 1994. The hospital and Sungkyunkwan University School of Medicine signed a teaching hospital agreement in February 1997.

The Samsung Comprehensive Cancer Center began treating patients in 2008 as a dedicated facility for the diagnosis and treatment of cancer. In March 2014, the hospital established the Heart Vascular Stroke Institute to coordinate cardiology, cardiac surgery, neurology, and vascular care, and opened the Maternal and Neonatal Intensive Care Center the same year. The Proton Therapy Center began treating patients in December 2015.

During the early 2020s, the hospital introduced chimeric antigen receptor (CAR) T-cell therapy, beginning in April 2021, and established a Precision Cancer Medicine Center for genomic-based cancer treatment planning in March 2022.
