= Mixtape (Stray Kids EP) =

EP by Stray Kids
- Released: January 8, 2018
- Recorded: 2017
- Studio: JYPE Studios
- Genre: K-pop; hip-hop
- Length: 24:02
- Language: Korean; English
- Label: JYP; Genie
- Producer: Armadillo; 3Racha; earattack; Matthew Engst; Garden; Jinjjasanai; Tobias Karlsson; Kim Sang-mi; Brandon Lowry; Rangga; This N That; Trippy

Stray Kids chronology
Mixtape (2018)	I Am Not (2018)

Singles from Mixtape
- 1. "Hellevator" Released: November 1, 2017; 2. "Beware" Released: January 8, 2018

Mixtape is the pre-debut extended play (EP) by South Korean boy group Stray Kids. The EP was released digitally and physically on January 8, 2018 by JYP Entertainment and distributed through Genie Music. It consists of seven songs, all of which were performed on their eponymous reality show. The album sold 45,249 physical copies in January.

== Background and development ==
The South Korean Boy Group Stray Kids was formed by JYP Entertainment in 2017 through a reality survival show titled Stray Kids broadcast by Mnet. During the show, the contestants performed seven new songs that were co-written and co-composed by themselves. Most of the song was produced by 3Racha, Stray Kids pre-debut Hiphop and Producing Unit, but got remastered during the show.

Mixtape was the first album released by the boy group as a pre-debut album that released before the group's official debut. On December 28, 2017, the boy group posted a track list image about the pre-debut album Mixtape release date. The image created a dark atmosphere by overlapping the silhouettes of the nine Stray Kids members and the shape of a cassette tape reminiscent of a mixtape. The album release date was announced with the phrase ‘2018.01.08’ in the center of the cassette tape. In addition, the track list for the album 'Mixtape' was also revealed. This album contains 7 tracks of self-composed songs performed by members while going through each stage of missions on Mnet's Stray Kids, which covers the debut process of Stray Kids.

== Track listing ==
Credits adapted from Melon

No.	Title	Lyrics	Music	Arrangement	Length
1.	"Hellevator"	Armadillo; 3Racha (Note: Normally in track's credit, 3Racha is separated as Bang Chan (3Racha), Seo Chang-bin (3Racha), and Han Ji-sung (3Racha).)	Armadillo; 3Racha; Rangga	Armadillo; Bang Chan (3Racha); Rangga	4:01
2.	"Beware" (Grrr 총량의 법칙 (Note: Grrr Chongnyang-ui Beopchik lit. "Grrr Law of total quantity"))	3Racha	3Racha; Armadillo; Trippy; 1take	Trippy	3:09
3.	"Spread My Wings" (어린 날개 (Note: Eorin Nalgae lit. "Young wings"))	3Racha	3Racha; Trippy	Trippy	3:18
4.	"Yayaya"	3Racha; earattack	earattack; 3Racha	earattack	3:21
5.	"Glow"	Seo Chang-bin (3Racha); Felix; Lee Min-ho	Bang Chan (3Racha); This N That	Bang Chan (3Racha); Garden; This N That	3:24
6.	"School Life"	3Racha; Yang Jeong-in; Kim Woojin; This N That	Brandon Lowry; Tobias Karlsson; Matthew Engst; Han Ji-sung (3Racha); Kim Woojin; Kim Sang-mi; Thrice Noble	Brandon Lowry; Tobias Karlsson; Matthew Engst; Kim Sang-mi; Thrice Noble	3:36
7.	"4419"	3Racha; Kim Seung-min; Hwang Hyun-jin	3Racha; Jinjjasanai	Jinjjasanai	3:13
Total length:					24:02

== Charts ==
=== Weekly charts ===
Chart (2018–2023)	Peak position
Hungarian Albums (MAHASZ)	33
Japanese Albums (Oricon)	47
New Zealand Heatseeker Albums (RMNZ)	9
South Korean Albums (Gaon)	2
UK Independent Album Breakers (OCC)	18
US Heatseekers Albums (Billboard)	6
US Independent Albums (Billboard)	22
US World Albums (Billboard)	2

=== Year-end charts ===
Chart (2018)	Position
South Korean Albums (Gaon)	71

== Certifications ==
Certifications for Mixtape
Region	Certification	Certified units/sales
South Korea (KMCA)	Platinum	250,000^{^}
^{^} Shipments figures based on certification alone.

== Release history ==
Release history and formats for Mixtape
Region	Date	Format	Distributor	Ref.
Various	January 8, 2018	Digital download	JYP Entertainment; Genie Music	
South Korea	January 8, 2018	Digital download	JYP Entertainment; Genie Music	
South Korea	January 8, 2018	CD	JYP Entertainment; Genie Music	
