= I Am Not =

EP by Stray Kids
- Released: March 26, 2018
- Recorded: 2018
- Studio: Ji-sang's Studio; In Grid Studio; JYPE Studios; The Vibe Studio
- Genre: K-pop; hip-hop
- Length: 26:58
- Language: Korean; English
- Label: JYP; Iriver
- Producer: 3Racha; Kim Chella; Collapsedone; Fredro; Glory Face; Hong Ji-sang; This N That; Trippy

Stray Kids chronology
Mixtape (2018)	I Am Not (2018)	I Am Who (2018)

Singles from I Am Not
- 1. "District 9" Released: March 26, 2018; 2. "Mirror" Released: April 22, 2018

I Am Not (stylized as I am NOT) is the debut extended play (EP) by South Korean boy group Stray Kids. The EP was released digitally and physically on March 26, 2018 by JYP Entertainment and distributed through Iriver. A debut showcase titled Stray Kids Unveil: Op. 01: I Am Not was held the day before. The album sold 54,733 physical copies for the month of March.

The album was released in two versions physically—an “I am” version and a “NOT” version.

== Track listing ==
Credits adapted from Melon

I Am Not — Digital EP
No.	Title	Lyrics	Music	Arrangement	Length
1.	"NOT!"	Bang Chan (3Racha)	Bang Chan (3Racha); Hong Ji-sang	Hong Ji-sang	1:22
2.	"District 9"	3Racha (Note: Normally in track's credit, 3Racha is separated as Bang Chan (3Racha), Changbin (3Racha), and Han (3Racha).)	3Racha; Trippy	Trippy; Bang Chan (3Racha)	3:31
3.	"Mirror"	3Racha	3Racha; Lee Woo-min 'collapsedone'; Fredrik Ödesjö	Lee Woo-min 'collapsedone'; Fredro	3:40
4.	"Awaken"	3Racha	3Racha; Kim Park Chella	Kim Park Chella; Bang Chan (3Racha)	3:13
5.	"Rock" (돌 (Note: Pronounced Dol))	3Racha	3Racha; Glory Face (Full8loom)	Glory Face (Full8loom)	3:13
6.	"Grow Up" (잘 하고 있어 (Note: Jal hago isseo lit. "You're doing good"))	3Racha	3Racha; Trippy	Trippy; Bang Chan (3Racha)	3:30
7.	"3rd Eye"	3Racha	3Racha; This N That	This N That	4:03
Total length:					22:40

I Am Not — Physical EP bonus track
No.	Title	Lyrics	Music	Arrangement	Length
8.	"Mixtape #1"	Stray Kids	3Racha	Lee Woo-min 'collapsedone'	4:19
Total length:					27:00

== Charts ==
=== Weekly charts ===
Chart (2018–2023)	Peak position
Croatian International Albums (HDU)	29
New Zealand Heatseeker Albums (RMNZ)	9
South Korean Albums (Gaon)	4
US Heatseekers Albums (Billboard)	23
US World Albums (Billboard)	5

=== Year-end charts ===
Chart (2018)	Position
South Korean Albums (Gaon)	54

== Certifications ==
Certifications and sales figures for I Am Not
Region	Certification	Certified units/sales
South Korea (KMCA)	Platinum	250,000^{^}
^{^} Shipments figures based on certification alone.
