= List of Stray Kids live performances =

Stray Kids live performances
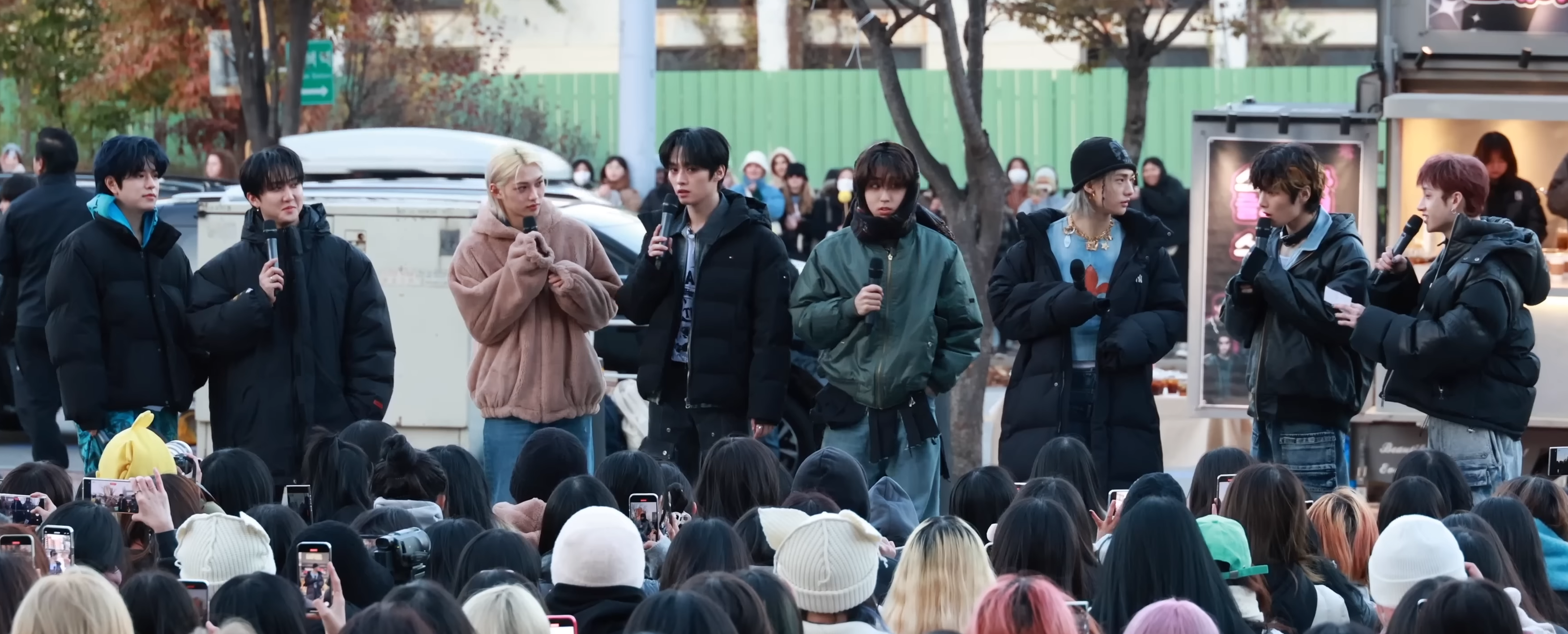
- Stray Kids mini fanmeeting in November 2023; L-R: Seungmin, Changbin, Felix, Lee Know, Han, Hyunjin, I.N, Bang Chan
- Concert tours: 5
- One-off concerts: 1
- Promotional tours: 1
- Showcase tours: 1
- Showcases: 7
- Fanmeetings: 8

The following is a comprehensive list of South Korean boy band Stray Kids' live performances. The group has performed on five concert tours, one one-off concert, one promotional tour, one showcase tour, seven showcases, eight fanmeetings, and numerous music festivals and live performances.

== Concert tours ==
Title	Date(s)	Associated album(s)	Location	Shows	Setlist	Attendance	Ref.
District 9: Unlock World Tour	November 23, 2019 – February 16, 2020 (Note: The tour was originally scheduled to conclude on August 30, 2020, but due to the COVID-19 pandemic, the 14 shows on the European and Asian legs were cancelled or postponed indefinitely.)	Clé: Levanter	South Korea, United States	10	Setlist: 1. "District 9"; 2. "Victory Song"; 3. "Question"; 4. "Rock"; 5. "Side Effects"; 6. "Beware"; 7. "M.I.A"; 8. "Wow" (Lee Know, Hyunjin, Felix); 9. "Mixtape#4"; 10. "Get Cool"; 11. "Awkward Silence"; 12. "My Universe" (Seungmin, I.N featuring Changbin); 13. "3rd Eye"; 14. "I Am You" (ballad version); 15. "We Go" (Bang Chan, Changbin, Han); 16. "Road Not Taken"; 17. "TMT"; 18. "My Pace"; 19. "Double Knot"; 20. "Boxer"; 21. "Hellevator"; 22. "Miroh"; 23. "Grow Up" (encore); 24. "Astronaut" (November 23) / "Rock" (November 24) (encore); 25. "Yayaya" (encore)	—N/a	
Maniac World Tour	April 29, 2022 – April 2, 2023	Oddinary; Circus; Maxident; The Sound	Asia, North America, Australia	42	Setlist: 1. "Maniac"; 2. "Venom"; 3. "Red Lights" (8-member version); 4. "Easy"; 5. "All In" (Korean version); 6. "District 9"; 7. "Back Door"; 8. "Charmer"; 9. "B Me"; 10. "Lonely St."; 11. "Side Effects"; 12. "Thunderous"; 13. "Domino"; 14. "God's Menu"; 15. "Cheese"; 16. "Yayaya" + "Rock"; 17. "Waiting for Us"; 18. "Muddy Water"; 19. "Silent Cry"; 20. "Hellevator"; 21. "Double Knot"; 22. "Top"; 23. "Victory Song"; 24. "Astronaut" (April 29) / "My Pace" (April 30) / "Ta" (May 1) (encore); 25. "Miroh" (encore); 26. "Star Lost" (encore); 27. "Haven" (encore); 28. "Boxer" (May 1) (double encore)	—N/a	
5-Star Dome Tour	August 16 – October 29, 2023	5-Star; Social Path / Super Bowl (Japanese Ver.)	South Korea, Japan	10	Setlist: 1. "Battle Ground"; 2. "Freeze"; 3. "Item"; 4. "Case 143"; 5. "God's Menu"; 6. "All In"; 7. "Wolfgang"; 8. "Miroh"; 9. "Rev It Up" (Felix solo); 10. "Don't Say" (Han solo); 11. "Perfume" (Seungmin solo); 12. "Hug Me" (I.N solo); 13. "Limbo" (Lee Know solo); 14. "Baby" (Bang Chan solo); 15. "Mic&Brush" (Hyunjin solo); 16. "My Name" (Changbin solo); 17. "Circus"; 18. "Topline"; 19. "S-Class"; 20. "Chill"; 21. "Slump"; 22. "Super Board"; 23. "My Pace"; 24. "Question"; 25. "Social Path"; 26. "Super Bowl" / "Megaverse"; 27. "Hall of Fame"; 28. "Astronaut" (encore); 29. "Star Lost" (encore); 30. "Fairytale" (encore); 31. "Fam" (encore); 32. "Haven" (encore)	340,000	
Dominate World Tour	August 24, 2024 – October 19, 2025	Ate; Giant; Hop; Hollow; Karma	Asia, Australia, Latin America, North America, Europe	56	Setlist: 1. "Mountains"; 2. "Thunderous"; 3. "Jjam"; 4. "District 9"; 5. "Back Door"; 6. "Hold My Hand" (Han solo); 7. "Youth" (Lee Know solo); 8. "As We Are" (Seungmin solo); 9. "So Good" (Hyunjin solo); 10. "Chk Chk Boom"; 11. "Topline"; 12. "Super Bowl"; 13. "Comflex"; 14. "Lalalala"; 15. "Twilight"; 16. "Lonely St."; 17. "Social Path" (Korean version); 18. "Railway" (Bang Chan solo); 19. "Hallucination" (I.N solo); 20. "Unfair" (Felix solo); 21. "Ultra" (Changbin solo); 22. "Get Lit"; 23. "Item"; 24. "Domino"; 25. "God's Menu"; 26. "S-Class"; 27. "Venom"; 28. "Maniac"; 29. "I Like It" (encore); 30. "Case 143" (encore); 31. "My Pace" (encore); 32. "Stray Kids" (encore); 33. "Miroh" (encore); 34. "Chk Chk Boom" (Festival version) (encore); 35. Surprise encore song	—N/a	
Run It World Tour	July 25, 2026 – March 7, 2027	This & That; Suiatsu	Asia	21	Setlist: 1. "Hall of Fame"; 2. "Hellevator"; 3. "District 9"; 4. "Miroh" + "Levanter" + "I Am You"; 5. "Side Effects"; 6. "Double Knot"; 7. "Back Door"; 8. "Maniac"; 9. "God's Menu"; 10. "Creed"; 11. "Slash"; 12. "Divine"; 13. "Thunderous"; 14. "In My Head"; 15. "I Do"; 16. "Blind Spot"; 17. "Bleep"; 18. "Do It"; 19. "Lalalala"; 20. "Ceremony"; 21. "Chk Chk Boom"; 22. "S-Class"; 23. "Run It"; 24. "Stray Kids"; 25. "Phoenix"; 26. "After You"; 27. "Social Path"; 28. "Miroh"; 29. Encore song 30. Encore song	—N/a	

== One-off concerts ==
Title	Date(s)	Associated album(s)	Location	Venue	Setlist	Ref.
Unlock: Go Live In Life	November 22, 2020	Go Live; In Life	Seoul, South Korea	V Live (Beyond Live)	Setlist: 1. "District 9"; 2. "Victory Song"; 3. "Question"; 4. "Side Effects"; 5. "Double Knot"; 6. "M.I.A."; 7. "Wow" (Lee Know, Hyunjin, Felix); 8. "My Universe" (Seungmin, I.N featuring Changbin); 9. "Mixtape#4"; 10. "Blueprint"; 11. "God's Menu"; 12. "All In" (Korean version); 13. "Ex"; 14. "I Am You" (ballad version); 15. "We Go" (Bang Chan, Changbin, Han); 16. "Easy"; 17. "My Pace"; 18. "Back Door"; 19. "Boxer"; 20. "Hellevator"; 21. "Miroh"; 22. "Ta"	

== Promotional tours ==
Title	Date(s)	Associated album(s)	Location	Shows	Setlist	Ref.
Hi-Stay Tour in Korea	March 15 – April 20, 2019	Clé 1: Miroh	South Korea	4	Setlist: "Spread My Wings"; "District 9"; "My Pace"; "Get Cool"; "Boxer"; "Miroh"; "Yayaya" (encore); "Grow Up" (encore)	

== Showcase tours ==
Title	Date(s)	Associated album(s)	Location	Shows	Setlist	Attendance	Ref.
Unveil Tour "I Am..."	January 19 – September 27, 2019	I Am Not; I Am Who; I Am You	Asia, Australia, North America, Europe	14	Setlist: 1. "Hellevator"; 2. "Beware"; 3. "Not!"; 4. "Awaken"; 5. "District 9"; 6. "Mirror"; 7. "Who?"; 8. "Insomnia"; 9. "Voices"; 10. "My Pace"; 11. "You."; 12. "My Side"; 13. "I Am You"; 14. "4419" (Bang Chan, Hyunjin, Seungmin); 15. "Glow" (Lee Know, Changbin, Felix); 16. "School Life" (Woojin, Han, I.N); 17. "Awkward Silence"; 18. "Get Cool"; 19. "Yayaya"; 20. "Grow Up"	100,000	

== Showcases ==
Title	Date(s)	Associated album(s)	Location	Venue	Setlist	Attendance	Ref.
Unveil [Op. 01: I Am Not]	March 25, 2018	I Am Not	Seoul, South Korea	Jangchung Arena	Setlist: 1. "Hellevator"; 2. "Beware"; 3. "4419"; 4. "Glow"; 5. "School Life"; 6. "Spread My Wings"; 7. "Mirror"; 8. "Rock"; 9. "District 9"; 10. "Grow Up"	3,000	
Unveil [Op. 02: I Am Who]	August 5, 2018	I Am Who	Seoul, South Korea	Grand Peace Palace	Setlist: 1. "Matryoshka" (3Racha); 2. "District 9"; 3. "Rock"; 4. "Mirror"; 5. "Hellevator"; 6. "Beware"; 7. "Voices"; 8. "Insomnia"; 9. "Awkward Silence"; 10. "Zone"; 11. "My Pace"; 12. "Grow Up"; 13. "Yayaya"	—N/a	
Unveil [Op. 03: I Am You]	October 21, 2018	I Am You	Seoul, South Korea	Olympic Hall	Setlist: 1. "My Pace"; 2. "Awkward Silence"; 3. "School Life"; 4. "Hellevator"; 5. "District 9"; 6. "My Side"; 7. "Get Cool"; 8. "I Am You"; 9. "Mixtape#2"; 10. "Rock"; 11. "Yayaya"; 12. "Grow Up"	—N/a	
Unveil the Miroh	March 25, 2019	Clé 1: Miroh	Seoul, South Korea	Yes24 Live Hall	Setlist: 1. "District 9"; 2. "Voices"; 3. "I Am You"; 4. "Victory Song"; 5. "Miroh"	—N/a	
Japan Showcase 2019 "Hi-Stay"	December 3, 2019	—N/a	Tokyo, Japan	Yoyogi National Stadium 1st Gymnasium	Setlist: 1. "District 9"; 2. "Victory Song"; 3. "Question"; 4. "Hellevator"; 5. "My Pace"; 6. "Awkward Silence"; 7. "I Am You"; 8. "M.I.A"; 9. "Double Knot"; 10. "Miroh"; 11. "Astronaut"; 12. "Grow Up"	8,000	
Online Unveil: Go Live	June 17, 2020	Go Live	Seoul, South Korea	V Live (Beyond Live)	Setlist: 1. "Side Effects"; 2. "Top"; 3. "Mixtape: On Track"; 4. "God's Menu"; 5. "Easy"; 6. "Hellevator"; 7. "Miroh"	—N/a	
Online Unveil: In Life	September 14, 2020	In Life	Seoul, South Korea	V Live (Beyond Live)	Setlist: 1. "Side Effects"; 2. "Top"; 3. "Mixtape: On Track"; 4. "God's Menu"; 5. "Easy"; 6. "Hellevator"; 7. "Miroh"	—N/a	

== Fanmeetings ==
Title	Date(s)	Location	Venue	Setlist	Attendance	Ref.
1st #LoveStay "SKZ-X"	February 20, 2021	Seoul, South Korea	V Live (Beyond Live)	Setlist: 1. "Spread My Wings"; 2. "Voices"; 3. "Top"; 4. "Back Door" (blindfolded); 5. "Get Cool" (part switch); 6. "Boxer"; 7. "You Can Stay"; 8. "Pacemaker"; 9. "God's Menu" (SKZoo version)	—N/a	
Staying Home Meeting	March 21, 2021	Seoul, South Korea	Smash	Setlist: 1. "Top" (Japanese version); 2. "All In"; 3. "Slump"; 4. "Back Door" (Japanese version); 5. "One Day"	—N/a	
2nd #LoveStay "SKZ's Chocolate Factory"	February 12–13, 2022	Seoul, South Korea	Olympic Hall	Setlist: 1. "Domino"; 2. "The View"; 3. "Mixtape: Oh"; 4. "Mixtape: On Track"; 5. "District 9" / "Double Knot"; 6. "God's Menu"; 7. "Rock" / "Question"; 8. "Back Door"; 9. "Silent Cry"; 10. "Scars" (Korean version); 11. "Call Me Baby"; 12. "#LoveStay"; 13. "Haven"	—N/a	
3rd Fanmeeting "Pilot: For 5-Star"	July 1–2, 2023	Seoul, South Korea	KSPO Dome	Setlist: 1. "Freeze"; 2. "Charmer"; 3. "Neverending Story"; 4. "Case 143" / "Get Cool"; 5. "Get Cool" / "Thunderous"; 6. "Domino" / "Venom"; 7. "Waiting for Us" (Changbin, Hyunjin, Han, Felix); 8. "Muddy Water" (Bang Chan, Lee Know, Seungmin, I.N); 9. "Super Board"; 10. "Hello Stranger"; 11. "Star Lost"; 12. "Item"; 13. "Levanter"; 14. "S-Class"; 15. "God's Menu" / "Back Door"; 16. "#LoveStay" / "Grow Up"; 17. "Grow Up" / "Miroh"	—N/a	
4th Fanmeeting "SKZ's Magic School"	March 29–31, 2024	Seoul, South Korea	KSPO Dome	Setlist: 1. "Megaverse"; 2. "Hall of Fame"; 3. "Placebo"; 4. "Blind Spot"; 5. "Can't Stop" (all members version); 6. "Mixtape: On Track"; 7. "Get Lit"; 8. "District 9"; 9. "Sherlock (Clue + Note)"; 10. "Booster"; 11. "School Life"; 12. "Party's Not Over"; 13. "Miroh"	—N/a	
Fan Connecting 2024 "SKZ Toy World"	April 6–28, 2024	Osaka / Saitama, Japan	Kyocera Dome; Belluna Dome	Setlist: 1. "Fairytale" / "Butterflies"; 2. "Chill" (Japanese version) / "Novel"; 3. "Case 143" (Japanese version) / "Item"; 4. "Ta"; 5. "S-Class"; 6. "Lost Me" / "There"; 7. "Why?"; 8. "Megaverse"; 9. "Hall of Fame"; 10. "Get Lit"; 11. "District 9" / "Social Path"; 12. "Booster"; 13. "Lalalala"; 14. "Blind Spot"; 15. "Fam"; 16. "Miroh"	160,000	
5th Fanmeeting "SKZ 5'Clock"	February 14–16, 2025	Incheon, South Korea	Inspire Arena	Setlist: 1. "Walkin on Water"; 2. "Charmer"; 3. "Bounce Back"; 4. "I Am You"; 5. "Cover Me"; 6. "Hold My Hand" (Felix); 7. "Youth" (I.N); 8. "As We Are" (Changbin); 9. "So Good" (Bang Chan); 10. "Railway" (Han); 11. "Hallucination" (Lee Know); 12. "Unfair" (Hyunjin); 13. "Ultra" (Seungmin); 14. "Comflex" (day 1) / "Back Door" (day 2) / "Lalalala" (day 3); 15. "Chk Chk Boom"; 16. "Voices"; 17. "Walkin on Water" (Hip version); 18. "Case 143" (day 1) / "Star Lost" (day 2) / "Ta" (day 3); 19. "Astronaut" (day 1) / "DLC" (day 2) / "Haven" (day 3); 20. "I Like It"; 21. "Miroh"; 22. "Haven" / "Chk Chk Boom" (Festival version) (day 3); 23. "Topline" (day 3); 24. "Megaverse" (day 3)	—N/a	
6th Fanmeeting "Stay in Our Little House"	March 28 – April 5, 2026	Incheon, South Korea	Inspire Arena	Setlist: 1. "Divine"; 2. "Half-Time"; 3. "Bounce Back"; 4. "Collision"; 5. "Stay"; 6. "Truman" (Lee Know and Seungmin); 7. "Burnin' Tires" (Han and Felix); 8. "Escape" (Changbin and I.N); 9. "Cinema" (Bang Chan and Hyunjin); 10. "Give Me Your TMI"; 11. "Case 143"; 12. "Do It" (Turbo version); 13. "Ceremony"; 14. "0801"; 15. "I Like It"; 16. "Phoenix"; 17. "Social Path"; 18. "Miroh"	—N/a	

== Music festivals and joint concerts ==
Title	Date	Location	Performed song(s)	Ref.
KCON 2018 Japan	April 14, 2018	Chiba, Japan	"Go Crazy!" + "Hands Up" (with Wooyoung); "District 9"	
COEX C-Festival	May 5, 2018	Seoul, South Korea	"Hellevator"; "District 9"	
37th Woonhyun Music Festival	May 23, 2018	Seoul, South Korea	"Hellevator"; "District 9"; "Mirror"; "Yayaya"	
U-Clean Youth Concert	May 26, 2018	Seoul, South Korea	"Hellevator"; "District 9"; "Yayaya"	
2018 On Dream School Concert	June 19, 2018	Donghae, South Korea	"District 9"; "Yayaya"	
Klub KCON 2018 NY	June 22, 2018	Newark, United States	"District 9"; "Beware"; "Hellevator"	
KCON 2018 NY	June 23, 2018	Newark, United States	"Matryoshka" (3Racha); "District 9"; "Mirror"; "Hellevator"; "Yayaya"; "Rock" (Note: As part of "Passion" show with Pentagon)	
K-Star 2018 Korea Music Festival	August 2, 2018	Seoul, South Korea	"District 9"; "New Face"	
Incheon K-pop Concert 2018	September 1, 2018	Incheon, South Korea	"My Pace"	
Music Bank in Berlin	September 15, 2018	Berlin, Germany	"District 9"; "Hellevator"; "My Pace"; "Happy Song"; "DNA"; "Hard Carry"	
KCON 2018 Thailand	September 29, 2018	Pak Kret, Thailand	"It's Raining"; "My Pace"; "District 9"	
Spotify on Stage 2018 in Jakarta	October 12, 2018	Jakarta, Indonesia	"Hellevator"; "Grow Up"; "Awkward Silence"; "My Pace"; "District 9"	
2018 Jeju Hallyu Festival	November 4, 2018	Jeju, South Korea	"Adore U"; "I Am You"	
Kpop Big5 Concert	May 4, 2019	Düsseldorf, Germany	"Miroh"; "Hellevator"; "District 9"; "My Pace"; "Yayaya"	
Jeddah Season	July 13, 2019	Jeddah, Saudi Arabia	"Hellevator"; "District 9"; "Beware"; "Victory Song"; "Miroh"; "Awaken"; "Get Cool"; "My Pace"; "Yayaya"	
2019 Ulsan K-pop Festival	July 22, 2019	Ulsan, South Korea	"Side Effects"; "Miroh"	
29th Lotte Duty Free Family Festival	August 11, 2019	Seoul, South Korea	"Side Effects"; "Victory Song"; "District 9"; "My Pace"; "Miroh"	
KCON 2019 LA	August 18, 2019	Los Angeles, United States	Opening performance (3Racha and N.Flying); "Side Effects"; "Victory Song"; "District 9"; "Miroh"; "My Pace"	
2019 K-World Festa	August 24, 2019	Seoul, South Korea	"Miroh"; "Side Effects"	
2019 Incheon Airport Sky Festival	August 31, 2019	Incheon, South Korea	"Side Effects"; "Miroh"; "My Pace"	
KCON 2019 Thailand	September 29, 2019	Pak Kret, Thailand	"Maze of Memories" (3Racha) + "Runner's High" (3Racha with Hongjoong and Soyeon); "Road Not Taken"; "Side Effects"; "Victory Song"; "Miroh"	
2019 Asia Song Festival	October 12, 2019	Ulsan, South Korea	"Double Knot"; "Miroh"	
Spotify on Stage 2019 in Bangkok	October 16, 2019	Bangkok, Thailand	"Hellevator"; "Double Knot"; "Boxer"; "Miroh"; "District 9"; "My Pace"	
2019 Busan One Asia Festival	October 19, 2019	Busan, South Korea	"Double Knot"; "Miroh"	
KAMP Singapore 2019	November 10, 2019	Singapore, Singapore	"Hellevator"; "District 9"; "Side Effects"; "Boxer"; "Double Knot"; "Victory Song"; "My Pace"; "Get Cool"; "Miroh"	
KCON:TACT 2020 Summer	June 23, 2020	—N/a	"Passion" (3Racha); "God's Menu"; "Top"; "Mixtape: On Track"; "Double Knot"; "Miroh"	
World Is One	July 9, 2020	—N/a	"God's Menu"; "Miroh"	
26th Dream Concert – Connect:D	July 26, 2020	—N/a	"Miroh"; "God's Menu"	
Korea on Stage – Suwon Hwaseong	September 3, 2020	Suwon, South Korea	"Miroh"; "God's Menu"	
2020 Super Concert – Super On:tact	September 27, 2020	—N/a	"Back Door"; "Easy"; "Double Knot"; "God's Menu"; "Miroh"	
KCON:TACT 3	March 26, 2021	—N/a	"Victory Song"; "God's Menu"; "Back Door"; "Hellevator"; "Miroh"	
KCON:TACT 4 U	June 27, 2021	—N/a	"Miroh"; "My Universe" (Seungmin and I.N featuring Changbin); "God's Menu"; "Back Door"; "Airplane"; "Blueprint"	
KCON:TACT Hi 5	September 19, 2021	—N/a	"Thunderous"; "Zombie" (Bang Chan and Seungmin); "The View"; "God's Menu"; "Haven"; "Back Door"	
TikTok Stage: Discover Your Own Joy	September 30, 2021	—N/a	"Back Door"; "Domino"; "The View"; "Thunderous"	
World Is One 2021 Concert	October 30, 2021	—N/a	"Thunderous"; "Domino"	
2021 Changwon K-pop World Festival	November 3, 2021	Changwon, South Korea	"Thunderous"	
Unite On: Live Concert	November 6, 2021	—N/a	"Cyper" + "Drive" + "Scissor" (3Racha); "Thunderous"; "Sorry, I Love You"; "Back Door"	
Expo 2020: Korea National Day K-pop Concert	January 17, 2022	Dubai, United Arab Emirates	"God's Menu"; "Back Door"; "Miroh"; "Thunderous"	
The Magical Story	March 31, 2022	—N/a	"Maniac"; "Thunderous"; "Mixtape: Oh"; "The View"; "Miroh"	
2022 Seoul Festa Opening Performance: K-pop Super Live	August 10, 2022	Seoul, South Korea	"God's Menu"; "Maniac"	
KCON 2022 LA	August 20, 2022	Los Angeles, United States	"Yeah" (3Racha); "Maniac"; "Thunderous"; "Back Door"; "God's Menu"	
Music Bank in Paris	April 8, 2023	Nanterre, France	"Case 143"; "Maniac"; "God's Menu"; "Miroh"	
32nd Lotte Duty Free Family Festival	June 16, 2023	Seoul, South Korea	"God's Menu"; "Back Door"; "S-Class"; "Domino"	
Lollapalooza Paris 2023	July 21, 2023	Paris, France	"Venom"; "Maniac"; "Thunderous"; "Domino"; "God's Menu"; "Hey Day"; "S-Class"; "Topline"; "Super Bowl"; "Item"; "Lonely St."; "Cheese"; "Super Board"; "My Pace"; "Miroh"; "Haven"	
KCON LA 2023	August 20, 2023	Los Angeles, United States	"S-Class"; "District 9"; "Super Bowl"; "God's Menu"; "Topline"	
Global Citizen Festival 2023	September 23, 2023	New York City, United States	"3Racha"; "Hey Day"; "Topline" (3Racha) (Note: Stray Kids were initially scheduled to appear on Global Citizen Festival 2023, but due to Lee Know, Hyunjin, and Seungmin minor car accident, only Bang Chan, Changbin, and Han (as 3Racha) performed instead.)	
Le Gala des Pièces Jaunes 2024	January 26, 2024	Paris, France	"S-Class"; "Topline"; "God's Menu"	
K-Wave Concert Inkigayo	June 2, 2024	Seoul, South Korea	"Lose My Breath"; "S-Class"; "God's Menu"	
Show! Music Core in Japan	June 29, 2024	Saitama, Japan	"S-Class"; "Case 143"; "Super Bowl"; "God's Menu"; "Miroh"	
I-Days Milano 2024	July 12, 2024	Milan, Italy	"S-Class"; "Freeze"; "Super Bowl"; "Topline"; "Thunderous"; "Item"; "Domino"; "Lonely St."; "Social Path"; "Charmer"; "My Pace"; "Back Door"; "Maniac"; "God's Menu"; "Lalalala"; "Victory Song"; "Miroh"; "Topline" (encore)	
British Summer Time Hyde Park 2024	July 14, 2024	London, England	"S-Class"; "Freeze"; "Super Bowl"; "Topline"; "Thunderous"; "Item"; "Domino"; "Lonely St."; "Social Path"; "Charmer"; "My Pace"; "Back Door"; "Maniac"; "God's Menu"; "Lalalala"; "Victory Song"; "Miroh"; "Topline" (encore); "Megaverse" (encore); "Haven" (encore)	
SBS Gayo Daejeon Summer 2024	July 21, 2024	Incheon, South Korea	"Maniac"; "Chk Chk Boom"; "Hall of Fame"	
Lollapalooza 2024	August 2, 2024	Chicago, United States	"S-Class"; "Freeze"; "Super Bowl"; "Topline"; "Item"; "Thunderous"; "Domino"; "Lonely St."; "Social Path"; "Charmer"; "My Pace"; "Back Door"; "Maniac"; "God's Menu"; "Chk Chk Boom"; "Lalalala"; "Victory Song"; "Miroh"; "Topline" (encore); "Chk Chk Boom" (Festival version) (encore); "Haven" (encore)	
2024 Music Bank Global Festival in Japan	December 15, 2024	Fukuoka, Japan	"Chk Chk Boom"; "Jjam"; "Giant"; "Stray Kids"; "Walkin on Water"	
2025 Music Bank Global Festival in Japan	December 14, 2025	Tokyo, Japan	"Ceremony"; "Comflex"; "Social Path"; "In My Head"; "Topline"; "Do It"	
Le Gala des Pièces Jaunes 2026	January 22, 2026	Nanterre, France	"Chk Chk Boom"; "Do It"; "Ceremony"; "Lalalala"	
Governors Ball Music Festival 2026	June 6, 2026	New York City, United States	"Topline"; "S-Class"; "Bounce Back"; "Maniac"; "Domino"; "Thunderous"; "Divine"; "Walkin on Water"; "God's Menu"; "Chk Chk Boom"; "Item"; "Lalalala" (rock version); "Social Path" (Korean version); "Side Effects" (Festival version); "Do It" (Festival version); "Ceremony" (Karma version); "Blind Spot"; "Miroh"	
SBS Gayo Daejeon Summer 2026	August 9, 2026	Goyang, South Korea	"Ceremony"; "This & That"; "Chk Chk Boom"; "Miroh"	
StrayCity	September 9, 2026	Bogotá, Colombia	"Topline"; "S-Class"; "Bounce Back"; "Maniac"; "Domino"; "Thunderous"; "Back Door"; "Divine"; "Walkin on Water"; "God's Menu"; "Chk Chk Boom"; "Lalalala" (rock version); "Social Path" (Korean version); "This & That" (Cool version); "Side Effects"; "Do It" (Festival version); "Ceremony" (Karma version); "Blind Spot"; "Stray Kids"; "After You"; "Miroh"; "This & That" (Festival version); "Farming"; "Chk Chk Boom" (Festival version)	
Rock in Rio 2026	September 11, 2026	Rio de Janeiro, Brazil	"Topline"; "S-Class"; "Bounce Back"; "Maniac"; "Domino"; "Thunderous"; "Divine"; "Walkin on Water"; "God's Menu"; "Chk Chk Boom"; "Item"; "Lalalala" (rock version); "Social Path" (Korean version); "This & That"; "Side Effects"; "Do It" (Festival version); "Ceremony" (Karma version); "Stray Kids"; "After You"; "Run It"; "Miroh"; "This & That" (Festival version); "Hall of Fame"	
StrayCity	September 14, 2026	San Isidro, Argentina	"Topline"; "S-Class"; "Bounce Back"; "Maniac"; "Domino"; "Thunderous"; "Divine"; "Walkin on Water"; "God's Menu"; "Chk Chk Boom"; "Lalalala" (rock version); "Social Path" (Korean version); "This & That"; "Side Effects"; "Do It" (Festival version); "Ceremony" (Karma version); "Stray Kids"; "After You"; "Run It"; "Miroh"; "Hall of Fame"; "Chk Chk Boom" (Festival version)	
StrayCity	September 15, 2026	San Isidro, Argentina	"Topline"; "S-Class"; "Bounce Back"; "Maniac"; "Domino"; "Thunderous"; "Divine"; "Walkin on Water"; "God's Menu"; "Chk Chk Boom"; "Lalalala" (rock version); "Social Path" (Korean version); "This & That" (Cool version); "Side Effects"; "Do It" (Festival version); "Ceremony" (Karma version); "Stray Kids"; "After You"; "Run It"; "Miroh"; "Ceremony" (Festival version); "Haven"	
StrayCity	September 25, 2026	Mexico City, Mexico	"Topline"; "S-Class"; "Bounce Back"; "Maniac"; "Domino"; "Thunderous"; "Divine"; "Walkin on Water"; "God's Menu"; "Chk Chk Boom"; "Lalalala" (rock version); "Social Path" (Korean version); "This & That"; "Side Effects"; "Do It" (Festival version); "Ceremony" (Karma version); "Stray Kids"; "After You"; "Run It"; "Miroh"; "Hall of Fame"; "Chk Chk Boom" (Festival version)	
StrayCity	September 26, 2026	Mexico City, Mexico	"Topline"; "S-Class"; "Bounce Back"; "Maniac"; "Domino"; "Thunderous"; "Divine"; "Walkin on Water"; "God's Menu"; "Chk Chk Boom"; "Lalalala" (rock version); "Social Path" (Korean version); "This & That"; "Side Effects"; "Do It" (Festival version); "Ceremony" (Karma version); "Stray Kids"; "After You"; "Run It"; "Miroh"; "Hall of Fame"; "Blueprint"	
2026 Music Bank Global Festival in Japan	December 13, 2026	Tokyo, Japan	TBA	

== Awards shows ==
Title	Date	Location	Performed song(s)	Ref.
2nd Soribada Best K-Music Awards	August 30, 2018	Seoul, South Korea	"My Pace"	
2018 Asia Artist Awards	November 28, 2018	Seoul, South Korea	"I Am You"	
2018 Mnet Asian Music Awards	December 10, 2018	Seoul, South Korea	"Like Ooh-Ahh"; "My Pace"	
2018 Mnet Asian Music Awards	December 12, 2018	Saitama, Japan	"Overdose" + "Growl"; "P.A.C.E."; "Hellevator" + "District 9"	
33rd Golden Disc Awards	January 6, 2019	Seoul, South Korea	"Bang Bang Bang"; "Road" (Bang Chan, Woojin, Seungmin, I.N); "I Am You"	
28th Seoul Music Awards	January 15, 2019	Seoul, South Korea	"I Am You"; "Yayaya"; "My Pace"	
8th Gaon Chart Music Awards	January 23, 2019	Seoul, South Korea	"I Am You"	
1st The Fact Music Awards	April 24, 2019	Incheon, South Korea	"Mixtape#1"; "Miroh"	
14th Asia Model Awards	June 10, 2019	Seoul, South Korea	"Miroh"	
3rd Soribada Best K-Music Awards	August 22, 2019	Seoul, South Korea	"Side Effects"	
2019 V Live Awards "V Heartbeat"	November 16, 2019	Seoul, South Korea	"3rd Eye"; "Side Effects"; "Carpe Diem" (Changbin and Han); "Double Knot"	
4th Asia Artist Awards	November 26, 2019	Hanoi, Vietnam	"Double Knot"; "Miroh"	
9th Gaon Chart Music Awards	January 8, 2020	Seoul, South Korea	"Levanter"	
4th Soribada Best K-Music Awards	August 13, 2020	Seoul, South Korea	"God's Menu"	
5th Asia Artist Awards	November 28, 2020	Seoul, South Korea	"God's Menu"; "Back Door"	
2020 Mnet Asian Music Awards	December 6, 2020	Paju, South Korea	"Victory Song" (MAMA version); "Triangular Fight" (Hyunjin with Juyeon and San) (Note: As part of "Qui Fert Pondus Coronae Velit" show with The Boyz and Ateez)	
3rd The Fact Music Awards	December 12, 2020	Seoul, South Korea	"God's Menu"; "Back Door"	
35th Golden Disc Awards	January 10, 2021	Seoul, South Korea	"God's Menu" (performance version) + "Back Door"	
30th Seoul Music Awards	January 31, 2021	Seoul, South Korea	"Once in a Life Time" (Seungmin with Seunghee, Hyunjae, Lia, Jongho, Kwon Eun-bi); "Back Door"	
4th The Fact Music Awards	October 2, 2021	Seoul, South Korea	"Surfin'" + "Gone Away" + "Red Lights"; "Thunderous"	
6th Asia Artist Awards	December 2, 2021	Seoul, South Korea	"Domino"; "Thunderous"	
2021 Mnet Asian Music Awards	December 11, 2021	Paju, South Korea	"Bloom the Sound" (Hyunjin with Heeseung, Karina, Wooyoung, Yeji, and Yeonjun); "Cheese"; "Hey, Monster!" (3Racha); "Thunderous" (rock version)	
36th Golden Disc Awards	January 8, 2022	Seoul, South Korea	"Thunderous"; "Top"; "Wolfgang"	
5th The Fact Music Awards	October 8, 2022	Seoul, South Korea	"Maniac"; "Case 143"	
2022 MAMA Awards	November 29, 2022	Osaka, Japan	"Venom"; "Maniac" (both MAMA version)	
2022 MAMA Awards	November 30, 2022	Osaka, Japan	"Music Makes One" (3Racha with Tiger JK and Jung Jae-il)	
7th Asia Artist Awards	December 13, 2022	Nagoya, Japan	"Charmer"; "Case 143"	
37th Golden Disc Awards	January 7, 2023	Bangkok, Thailand	"Super Board"; "Freeze"; "Case 143"	
2023 K Global Heart Dream Awards	August 10, 2023	Seoul, South Korea	"Item"; "S-Class"	
2023 MTV Video Music Awards	September 12, 2023	Newark, United States	"S-Class"	
6th The Fact Music Awards	October 10, 2023	Incheon, South Korea	"Topline"; "S-Class"	
2023 Billboard Music Awards	November 20, 2023	—N/a (Note: The performance was filmed in Seoul, South Korea)	"S-Class"; "Lalalala"	
8th Asia Artist Awards	December 13, 2023	Bocaue, Philippines	"Maniac"; "Get Lit"; "Topline"; "Lalalala"	
38th Golden Disc Awards	January 6, 2024	Jakarta, Indonesia	"Megaverse"; "S-Class"; "Hall of Fame"	
Asia Star Entertainer Awards 2024	April 10, 2024	Yokohama, Japan	"Super Bowl"; "Social Path"; "S-Class"	
2024 Billboard Music Awards	December 12, 2024	—N/a	"Chk Chk Boom"; "Jjam"	
2025 K-World Dream Awards	August 21, 2025	Seoul, South Korea	"Chk Chk Boom"; "Walkin on Water"	
2025 The Fact Music Awards	September 25, 2025	Macau, China	"Chk Chk Boom"; "Topline"; "Walkin on Water"; "Ceremony"; "Ceremony" (encore)	
2025 Korea Grand Music Awards	November 15, 2025	Incheon, South Korea	"S-Class"; "In My Head"; "Ceremony"	
2025 MAMA Awards	November 29, 2025	Hong Kong, China	"Creed"; "Chk Chk Boom"; "Divine"; "Ceremony" (Hip Hip version)	
10th Asia Artist Awards	December 6, 2025	Kaohsiung, Taiwan	"Bleep"; "Walkin on Water"; "Bounce Back"; "Ceremony"	
40th Golden Disc Awards	January 10, 2026	Taipei, Taiwan	"Divine"; "Do It" (Turbo version); "Ceremony" (Karma version)	
2026 TMELive International Music Awards	August 23, 2026	Hong Kong, China	"Topline"; "S-Class"; "Ceremony"; "Chk Chk Boom"; "Lalalala"; "Social Path"; "This & That"	

== Television shows and specials ==
Title	Date	Location	Performed song(s)	Ref.
Open Concert	July 7, 2018	Gwangju, South Korea	"District 9" (Note: Stray Kids also performed "Mirror" live but did not broadcast on television.)	
Open Concert	November 11, 2018	Jeongeup, South Korea	"I Am You"; "My Pace"	
2018 SBS Gayo Daejeon: The Wave	December 25, 2018	Seoul, South Korea	"New Wave" (with (G)I-dle and The Boyz) (Note: Bang Chan, Lee Know, and Hyunjin with Soyeon, Soojin, Yuqi, Younghoon, Juyeon, and Hwall); "District 9"	
2018 KBS Song Festival	December 28, 2018	Seoul, South Korea	"JYP of All Time" (with JYP Nation) (Note: List of songs Stray Kids performed at the 2018 KBS Song Festival: "Nobody" (Wonder Girls) by Bang Chan and Nayeon; "Again & Again" (2PM) by Woojin and Wonpil; "Lies" (g.o.d) by Woojin and Bang Chan with JB, Nayeon, and Jihyo; "J (Jackpot)" by Changbin and Han with BamBam, Jae, Young K, Dowoon, and Chaeyoung; "P (Precision)" by Lee Know, Hyunjin, Felix, Seungmin, and I.N with Nayeon, Jeongyeon, Sana, Jihyo, Mina; "Don't Leave Me" (Park Jin-young) by all JYP artists as JYP Nation)	
2018 MBC Gayo Daejejeon: The Live	December 31, 2018	Seoul, South Korea	"Age of Violence" (with The Boyz); "I Am You"	
Good Day New York	May 14, 2019	New York City, United States	"Miroh"	
We K-Pop	July 12, 2019	Seoul, South Korea	"Miroh"; "Mixtape#4"; "Side Effects"; "Voices"	
Immortal Songs: Singing the Legend	December 7, 2019	Seoul, South Korea	"Again & Again"	
2019 SBS Gayo Daejeon: Touch	December 25, 2019	Seoul, South Korea	"Be Responsible" (with NCT Dream) (Note: Hyunjin, Felix, and Seungmin with Jaemin, Chenle, and Jisung); "Miroh"	
2019 KBS Song Festival	December 27, 2019	Seoul, South Korea	"Side Effects"; "Double Knot"	
2019 MBC Gayo Daejejeon: The Chemistry	December 31, 2019	Seoul, South Korea	"History of K-pop" (with NCT Dream) (Note: List of songs Stray Kids performed on the "History of K-pop" part at the 2019 MBC Gayo Daejejeon: The Chemistry: "Com'Back" (Sechs Kies); "Fantastic Baby" (BigBang); "Love Shot" (Exo) with NCT Dream; "Boy with Luv" (BTS) with Jang Sung-kyu and NCT Dream); "Side Effects"	
Live with Kelly and Ryan	January 27, 2020	New York City, United States	"Levanter" (English version)	
Good Day New York	January 29, 2020	New York City, United States	"Double Knot" (English version)	
KTLA 5 Morning News	February 12, 2020	Los Angeles, United States	"Double Knot" (English version)	
Nizi Project	June 26, 2020	—N/a	"Top" (Japanese version)	
2020 KBS Song Festival: Connect	December 18, 2020	Seoul, South Korea	"Mischief" (Bang Chan and Changbin) (Note: As part of "Special Stage: Rap Performance" with Monsta X's Joohoney and I.M and NCT's Taeyong and Mark); "Dionysus"; "God's Menu"; "Hard Carry" (Hyunjin with Moonbin, Juyeon, and Shotaro)	
2020 SBS Gayo Daejeon: The Wonder Year	December 25, 2020	Daegu, South Korea	"My House"; "God's Menu"	
2020 MBC Gayo Daejejeon: The Moment	December 31, 2020	Seoul, South Korea	"SSAK3 Special" (with The Boyz, I-dle, Itzy, and Ive) (Note: List of songs: "Play That Summer" by Han with Juyeon and Lia; "In Summer" by Felix with Younghoon and Yuqi; "Beach Again" by Hyunjin with Hyunjae and Jang Won-young); "Back Door"; "Ta"	
Stray Kids Comeback Show "Noeasy" (Note: As part of variety show Kingdom Week <No+>)	August 23, 2021	Seoul, South Korea	"Wolfgang"; "The View"; "Grow Up"; "Thunderous"	
2021 KBS Song Festival: With	December 17, 2021	Seoul, South Korea	"Paradise" (Seungmin with Kim Woo-seok, Yoon San-ha, and Hyunjae); "Thunderous" (Note: Filmed at Namhansanseong, Gwangju, Gyeonggi Province)	
2021 SBS Gayo Daejeon: Welcome Home	December 25, 2021	Incheon, South Korea	"All I Want for Christmas Is You" (Bang Chan and Seungmin with all performers); "Merry Christmas Ahead" (Changbin, Han, Felix, Seungmin, and I.N); "Winter Falls"; "Thunderous" (Christmas version); "Mirotic" (Hyunjin with Moonbin, Yoo Tae-yang, Juyeon, and Woodz)	
2021 MBC Gayo Daejejeon: Together	December 31, 2021	Seoul, South Korea	"City of Stars" (Bang Chan and Felix with Lia); "Snow Prince" (Lee Know and Hyunjin with Mark, Jungwoo, and Chani); "Only You"; "Thunderous"; "Tiger Inside" (Lee Know with Moonbin, Juyeon, Q, Kino, Hwanwoong, and Kim Dong-hyun)	
The Late Show with Stephen Colbert	March 18, 2022	—N/a	"Maniac"	
Virtual Gayo Top 10	March 25, 2022	Seoul, South Korea	"Maniac"	
MTV Fresh Out Live	April 1, 2022	—N/a	"Maniac"	
Music Universe K-909	October 8, 2022	Seoul, South Korea	"Case 143"; "3Racha"; "Taste"; "Can't Stop"	
Best Artist 2022	December 13, 2022	Tokyo, Japan	"Maniac" (Japanese version); "Circus"	
2022 FNS Music Festival	December 14, 2022	Tokyo, Japan	"Case 143" (Japanese version)	
Music Station Ultra Super Live 2022	December 23, 2022	Tokyo, Japan	"Case 143" (Japanese version)	
2022 KBS Song Festival: Y2K	December 18, 2022	Seoul, South Korea	JYP Nation special stage (with Itzy and Nmixx) (Note: List of songs Stray Kids performed on the special stage: "If I Had to Say" (Kim Sung-jae) by Hyunjin, Han, and Felix; "You in My Blurred Memories" (Hyun Jin-young) by Hyunjin, Han, and Felix with Jiwoo, Kyujin, Ryujin, and Chaeryeong); "Case 143"; "Maniac"	
2022 SBS Gayo Daejeon: The Live Shout Out	December 24, 2022	Seoul, South Korea	"24 to 25"; "Christmas EveL"; "Case 143"	
2022 MBC Gayo Daejejeon: With Love	December 31, 2022	Seoul, South Korea	"Taste" (Lee Know, Hyunjin, and Felix); "Circus" (Korean version); "Case 143"	
Jimmy Kimmel Live!	March 29, 2023	Los Angeles, United States	"Maniac"	
Venue 101 Presents Stray Kids 5-Star Live	September 23, 2023	Tokyo, Japan	"S-Class"; "Social Path" (featuring Lisa); "Case 143" (Japanese version); "Back Door"; "Thunderous"	
2023 Music Bank Global Festival	December 15, 2023 (Note: Filmed on December 9, 2023)	Saitama, Japan	"Super Bowl"; "Social Path"; "S-Class"; "Lalalala"	
2023 SBS Gayo Daejeon: Switch On	December 25, 2023	Incheon, South Korea	"That's Okay" (Seungmin and I.N); "Battle Ground" (Korean version); "Lalalala"; "Megaverse"	
74th NHK Kōhaku Uta Gassen	December 31, 2023	Tokyo, Japan	"Case 143" (Japanese version); "Friend Like Me" (Bang Chan, Changbin, and Han with Koichi Yamadera and Sakurazaka46); "Idol" (Felix, Seungmin, and I.N as part of idols)	
2023 MBC Gayo Daejejeon: Dream Record	December 31, 2023	Seoul, South Korea	"White Love" (Lee Know, Hyunjin, and Felix); "River" + "Play with Fire" (Hyunjin with Yeji); "Topline" (with Tiger JK); "Lalalala" (rock version) (Note: All shows were pre-recorded due to 74th NHK Kōhaku Uta Gassen participation on the same day.)	
Good Morning America	May 15, 2024	New York City, United States	"Lose My Breath"	
The Kelly Clarkson Show	May 22, 2024	New York City, United States	"Lose My Breath"	
American Music Awards 50th Anniversary Special	October 6, 2024	Los Angeles, United States	"Bye Bye Bye" + "Chk Chk Boom"	
Best Artist 2024	November 30, 2024	Tokyo, Japan	"Giant"	
2024 FNS Music Festival	December 4, 2024	Tokyo, Japan	"Giant"	
2024 SBS Gayo Daejeon	December 25, 2024	Incheon, South Korea	"Walkin on Water"; "Mountains"	
Music Station Ultra Super Live 2024	December 27, 2024	Tokyo, Japan	"Chk Chk Boom" (Japanese version)	
2024 MBC Gayo Daejejeon: Wannabe	January 30, 2025	Seoul, South Korea	"Chk Chk Boom"; "Walkin on Water"	
Buzz Rhythm 02	June 13, 2025	Tokyo, Japan	"Walkin on Water"; "Hollow"	
The Weekly 99 Music	June 18, 2025	Tokyo, Japan	"Hollow"	
CDTV Live! Live! Christmas Love Song Fes.	December 15, 2025	Tokyo, Japan	"Christmas Love"	
2025 SBS Gayo Daejeon: Golden Loop	December 25, 2025	Incheon, South Korea	"Do It"; "Ceremony"	
Music Station Super Live 2025	December 26, 2025	Tokyo, Japan	"Ceremony"	
Happyō! Kotoshi Ichiban Kiita Uta: Nenkan Music Award 2025	December 29, 2025	Tokyo, Japan	"Chk Chk Boom" (Japanese version); "God's Menu"	
2025 MBC Gayo Daejejeon: Mut	December 31, 2025	Seoul, South Korea	"Peppermint Candy" (Seungmin with YB); "Thunderous"; "Divine"	
Soul Beam	February 16, 2026	Seoul, South Korea	"Ceremony"; "Thunderous"; "Divine"	
Best Hits Kayosai 2026	November 11, 2026	Tokyo, Japan	"Suiatsu"	
Best Artist 2026	November 28, 2026	Tokyo, Japan	TBA	
2026 FNS Music Festival	December 2, 2026	Tokyo, Japan	TBA	
2026 SBS Gayo Daejeon	December 25, 2025	Goyang, South Korea	TBA	

== Other performances ==
Title	Date	Location	Performed song(s)	Ref.
2018 Gangdong Pre-historic Culture Festival	October 14, 2018	Seoul, South Korea	"District 9"; "Hellevator"; "Awkward Silence"; "My Pace"	
The Golden Bell Challenge	December 30, 2018	Seoul, South Korea	"I Am You"	
Re:memVer Party	March 3, 2019	Seoul, South Korea	"I Am You"	
2019 Korea-China-Japan Cultural Festival	August 29, 2019	Incheon, South Korea	"Side Effects"; "District 9"	
SsangYong Tivoli G1.2T Showcase	May 13, 2020	—N/a	"Double Knot"; "My Pace"; "Miroh"	
Shopee Indonesia 11.11 Big Sale Live	November 11, 2020	—N/a	"God's Menu"; "Back Door"; "My Pace"; "Miroh"	
Shopee Indonesia Online Fanmeeting	December 12, 2020	—N/a	"God's Menu"; "Easy"	
MBN Y Forum	February 24, 2021	—N/a	"God's Menu"; "Back Door"	
Tokopedia WIB Indonesia K-Pop Awards	November 25, 2021	—N/a	"God's Menu"	
Expo 2020: Korea National Day	January 17, 2022	Dubai, United Arab Emirates	"Thunderous"	
2022 Seoul ePrix	August 14, 2022	Seoul, South Korea	"Maniac"; "Back Door"; "Thunderous"; "God's Menu"	
Stay with Bench: The Stray Kids Fan Meet	January 20, 2023	Pasay, Philippines	"God's Menu"; "Case 143"	
YouTube Brandcast	May 16, 2024	New York, United States	"S-Class"	
Presidential Committee on Popular Culture Exchange	October 1, 2025	Goyang, South Korea	"Thunderous"; "God's Menu"; "S-Class" (Note: Performed by taekwondo team K-Tigers); "Ceremony"	
