= Jeon Woo-chi (disambiguation) =

- Hangul: 전우치
- RR: Jeon Uchi
- MR: Chŏn Uch'i

Jeon Woo-chi (Korean: 전우치) is a Korean name that can be rendered using various spellings.

Chŏn Uch'i (fl. 15th century) was a taoist sorcerer during the Joseon period in Korea.

Jeon Woo-chi may refer to:

- Jeon Woo-chi: The Taoist Wizard, a 2009 South Korean film
- Jeon Woo-chi (TV series), a 2012 South Korean TV series
