= Divine (Stray Kids song) =

Single by Stray Kids

from the EP Do It
- Language: Korean; English
- A-side: "Do It"
- Released: November 21, 2025
- Studio: JYP (Seoul); Channie's "Room" (Seoul)
- Genre: Old school hip-hop
- Length: 3:07
- Label: JYP; Republic
- Composers: Bang Chan; Changbin; Han; Versachoi
- Lyricists: Bang Chan; Changbin; Han

Stray Kids singles chronology
| "In the Dark" (2025) | "Do It" / "Divine" (2025) | "Stay" (2026) |

Music video
- "Divine" on YouTube

"Divine" (Korean: 신선놀음; RR: Sinseonnoreum; lit. 'bed of roses') is a song by South Korean boy band Stray Kids from their second mixtape Do It. It was released through JYP Entertainment and Republic Records on November 21, 2025, as one of the mixtape's lead singles, alongside the title track.

== Background and release ==
Following the end of the band's Dominate: Celebrate on October 19, 2025, a part of the Dominate World Tour, Stray Kids announced their second mixtape, marketed as "SKZ It Tape", titled Do It. Its black-and-white trailer, featuring the members as present-day divines (seonin), was played on screen at the concert and later uploaded to their social media. The next day, the band posted the mixtape's track list; "Do It" and "Divine" serves as the dual lead singles. The group teased a snippet of "Divine" through the house-based mashup video, as well as its instrumentals via the band's social media. JYP Entertainment and Republic Records released "Divine" concurrently with the mixtape on November 21, 2025.

== Composition ==
Self-described as "new pop", "Divine" is a boom bap-based old-school hip-hop track. Opening with jazz and 1990s R&B, the song includes traditional Korean music elements of gutgeori jangdan "deong gideok kung deoreoreo" rhythms. Lyrically, "Divine" explores "breaking free from the constraints of the world and enjoying everything as if it were a new adventure."

== Music video ==
An accompanying music video for "Divine", directed by Sam Son, premiered on November 27, 2025, preceded by a teaser video. Inspired and paid homage by classic novel Chŏn Uch'i chŏn's protagonist and real-life Taoist scholar Chŏn Uch'i, the music video depicts Stray Kids as modern-day divines leading dokkaebi to have fun with the background of a palace. The video features the modern reinterpretations of Korean traditional arts, such as animated ink wash, Irworobongdo, and tiger paintings.

== Live performances ==
Stray Kids performed "Divine" for the first time as a part of "The K-pop Champion" shows on November 29 at the 2025 MAMA Awards, held at Kai Tak Stadium, Hong Kong.

== Credits and personnel ==
Personnel

- Stray Kids – lead vocals
  - Bang Chan (3Racha) – background vocals, instruments, computer programming, vocal direction, recording, digital editing
  - Changbin (3Racha) – background vocals, vocal direction
  - Han (3Racha) – background vocals, vocal direction
- Versachoi – instruments, computer programming, vocal direction, digital editing
- Eom Se-hee – recording
- Lee Kyeong-won – digital editing
- Yoon Won-kwon – mixing
- Kwon Nam-woo – mastering
- Lee Ha-neul – mixing and mastering in Dolby Atmos

Locations

- JYP Studios – recording
- Channie's "Room" – recording, digital editing
- Madmiix – mixing
- Sound Mastering – mastering
- BK Studio – mixing and mastering in Dolby Atmos

== Charts ==
=== Weekly charts ===
Weekly chart performance for "Divine"
| Chart (2025) | Peak position |
|---|---|
| Global 200 (Billboard) | 126 |
| Japan Hot Shot Songs (Billboard Japan) | 5 |
| New Zealand Hot Singles (RMNZ) | 15 |
| Russia Streaming (TopHit) | 96 |
| South Korea BGM (Circle) | 120 |
| South Korea Download (Circle) | 12 |
| UK Indie (Official Charts) | 37 |
| US World Digital Song Sales (Billboard) | 3 |

=== Monthly charts ===
Monthly chart performance for "Divine"
| Chart (2025) | Position |
|---|---|
| South Korea Download (Circle) | 21 |
