= Do It (mixtape) =

- Digital cover

Mixtape / EP by Stray Kids
- Released: November 21, 2025
- Studios: JYP (Seoul); Channie's "Room" (Seoul)
- Length: 14:13
- Languages: Korean; English
- Labels: JYP; Republic
- Producers: 2Spade; 3Racha; Nickko Young; Space Primates; Versachoi

Stray Kids chronology
Karma (2025)	Do It (2025)	SKZ-Replay 2026 Pt.1 (2026)

Singles from Do It
- 1. "Do It" Released: November 21, 2025; 2. "Divine" Released: November 21, 2025

Professional ratings
Review scores
Source	Rating
AllMusic	4/5 stars

Do It is the second mixtape by South Korean boy band Stray Kids. It was released on November 21, 2025, through JYP Entertainment and Republic Records. Marketed as a "SKZ It Tape" record, the mixtape is a follow-up to the "SKZhop Hiptape" record Hop (2024). Similar to its predecessors, 3Racha—Bang Chan, Changbin, and Han—worked on Do It with Space Primates, JBach, Versachoi, Nickko Young, and 2Spade. The mixtape was supported by the dual lead singles: the title track and "Divine", each accompanied by a music video. Commercially, Do It topped the album charts in South Korea, Austria, Hungary, Wallonia, and the United States.

== Background ==
In December 2024, Stray Kids released the first mixtape Hop, which was marketed as "SKZhop Hiptape". It contains " 'Stray Kids' only-new-genre' songs that have not been officially defined." The next year, in January, the band uploaded the video "Step Out 2025", outlining their accomplishments in 2024 and plans for the next year, including two albums release. The first work is the band's fourth studio album Karma in August. The album was supported by the encore shows of the Dominate World Tour, titled Dominate: Celebrate, at Incheon Asiad Main Stadium on October 18 and 19.

During the encore concerts, Stray Kids spoiled various mysterious phrases via their costumes, such as "It Tape" and "Do It". On the day of the final show, the band surprisingly announced the upcoming "SKZ It Tape" project, titled Do It, by playing the trailer on screen and later uploaded it to their social media. Set in modern and minimalist mansion, the trailer features all eight members as present-day divines (seonin), who "create cracks and change in a world that has come to a standstill." They possess a distinct energy and face the fear and oppression through whispers and spell-like actions. Eventually, the silent world breaks apart and visually changes from black-and-white to colors.

Stray Kids named a type of record "SKZ It Tape", as well as the previous "SKZHop Hiptape" for Hop, to differentiate it from their regular studio albums and EPs, as the band wants to explore the diversity of music more freely outside conventional releases, and described Do It as a "calm hustle spirit" of "let's just do it like we have been doing so far," following a period of self-celebration in Karma.

== Music and lyrics ==
Do It consists of four tracks, totaling 14 minutes and 13 seconds in length. The mixtape opens with the reggaeton-based title track, which expresses the message of "don't hesitate, trust your instincts, and move forward" by "just do[ing] it". Self-dubbed as a "New Pop", "Divine" includes the '90's funky new jack swing and boom bap-based old-school hip-hop sound with traditional Korean music elements of gutgeori's rhythm "deong gideok kung deoreoreo". It expresses the "breaking free from the constraints of the world and enjoying everything as if it were a new adventure." "Holiday" serves as a "break" of the mixtape with a "warmed" and "exhilarated" energy, and talks about a moment of respite from the hectic pace of daily life. The fourth track "Photobook" is an emotional rock ballad song delivered to their fans. The mixtape closes with the "Festival version" remix of "Do It".

== Release and promotion ==
Do It was released on November 21, 2025, being available in ten physical variants–Do (limited), It (standard), eight Accordion (standard)–digital Plve application, digital download, and streaming. On October 20, the day after the mixtape announcement, Stray Kids revealed the mixtape's track list, which consists of five tracks, including the two lead singles, "Do It" and "Divine", as well as the track list for "Do It" remix EP. The next day, the band posted a promotional itinerary for the mixtape. The first teaser images show the members, portrayed as "present-day divines", in all-black styling against the landscape of sky, beach, and rocks. The second depicts a pink-themed party with "dreamy yet transcendent", "dazzling" but "eerie and uncanny" atmosphere. Snippets of all tracks were teased through house-based mashup on "dream-like" and "surreal" animated video, and their instrumentals via the band's social media.

On November 19, Stray Kids uploaded the video Intro "Do It" to discuss the album's production and behind-the-scenes, and held a masquerade-themed private pre-listening event the next day. An accompanying music video for "Do It" premiered in conjunction with the release of the mixtape on November 21; the "Divine" music video was uploaded the following week, on November 27. The band partnered with Soundwave to launch Do It pop-up store from November 22 to December 6 at Resone Hongdae. The band performed "Do It" at music programs Music Bank, Show! Music Core, and Inkigayo between November 21 and 23, and debuted the performance of "Divine" on November 29 at the 2025 MAMA Awards in Hong Kong. Furthermore, Stray Kids gave interviews on news programs JTBC Newsroom, and SBS 8 News, and magazine Allure, and Bang Chan and Felix on Australian talk show The Morning Show. Individually, I.N appeared on the cover for the December 2025 issue of magazine Cosmopolitan Korea, Felix on Uhm Jung-hwa's online shows And-ing Yoo Byung-jae's Hate Scary Stuff, and variety show You Quiz on the Block, and Lee Know on Seungkwan's Bibbidi-Bobbidi-Boo etc.

== Commercial performance ==
Spotify reported that Do It has surpassed one million pre-saves. According to Hanteo Chart, the mixtape sold 1.49 million copies on its first day of release, and 2.21 million copies within a week. Do It debuted at number one on South Korea's Circle Album Chart with 2,030,000 copies; the Plve edition reached number four with 150,000 copies. The mixtape was the 2025's third best-selling album in South Korea, behind the band's own Karma and Seventeen's Happy Burstday.

In the United States, Do It debuted at number one on the Billboard 200 dated December 6, 2025, extending the record for the first act to debut the first eight entries atop the chart, and the third most number-one albums by a musical group in the country, tying with U2 and behind the Beatles (19) and the Rolling Stones (9). The mixtape earned 295,000 album-equivalent units, comprising 286,000 pure sales and 9,000 streaming equivalent album units (equaling 13.98 million on-demand streams). It became the seventh-largest sales unit in its debut week and the fourth-largest in terms of pure sales of 2025. Additionally, Do It topped the Top Album Sales, the Top Current Album Sales, and the World Albums charts.

== Track listing ==
Do It track listing
No.	Title	Lyrics	Music	Arrangement	Length
1.	"Do It"	Bang Chan (3Racha); Changbin (3Racha); Han (3Racha); JBach	Bang Chan; Changbin; Han; JBach; Marc Sibley; Nathan Cunningham	Space Primates	2:39
2.	"Divine" (신선놀음)	Bang Chan; Changbin; Han	Bang Chan; Changbin; Han; Versachoi	Versachoi; Bang Chan	3:07
3.	"Holiday"	Bang Chan; Han	Bang Chan; Han; Versachoi	Versachoi	3:07
4.	"Photobook"	Bang Chan; Changbin; Han	Bang Chan; Changbin; Han; Nickko Young	Nickko Young	2:53
5.	"Do It" (Festival version)	Bang Chan; Changbin; Han; JBach	Bang Chan; Changbin; Han; JBach; Sibley; Cunningham	Space Primates; 2Spade	2:27
Total length:					14:13

== Credits and personnel ==
Musicians

- Stray Kids – lead vocals (all), background vocals (4)
  - Bang Chan (3Racha) – background vocals (1–3, 5), instruments (2), computer programming (2), vocal direction (all)
  - Changbin (3Racha) – background vocals (1–2, 5), vocal direction (1–2, 5)
  - Han (3Racha) – background vocals (1–2, 5), vocal direction (1–3, 5)
- Space Primates – keyboard (1), computer programming (1)
- Versachoi – instruments (2–3), computer programming (2–3), vocal direction (2)
- Nickko Young – piano (4), synthesizer (4), guitar (4), bass guitar (4), drums (4)
- 2Spade – bass guitar (5), synthesizer (5), drums (5), programming (5)

Technical

- Kwak Bo-eun – recording (1, 3, 5)
- Lee Chang-hoon – recording (1, 5)
- Eom Se-hee – recording (1–2, 5)
- Bang Chan (3Racha) – recording (2–4), digital editing (2–4)
- Louis. K – digital editing (1, 3, 5), mixing (3–5)
- Lee Kyeong-won – digital editing (2)
- Versachoi – digital editing (2–3)
- Josh Gudwin – mixing (1)
  - Felix Byrne – assistant (1)
- Yoon Won-kwon – mixing (2)
- Kwon Nam-woo – mastering (all)
- Lee Ha-neul – mixing and mastering in Dolby Atmos (all)

Locations

- JYP Studios – recording (1–3, 5)
- Channie's "Room" – recording (2–4), digital editing (2–4)
- Ritz Lab Studio – digital editing (1, 3, 5), mixing (3–5)
- Gudwin Sound Studios – mixing (1)
- Madmiix – mixing (2)
- Sound Mastering – mastering (all)
- BK Studio – mixing and mastering in Dolby Atmos (all)

== Charts ==
=== Weekly charts ===
Weekly chart performance for Do It
Chart (2025)	Peak position
Australia (ARIA)	10 (Note: Per Australian chart rules, albums of five tracks or fewer chart on the singles chart.)
Austrian Albums (Ö3 Austria)	1
Belgian Albums (Ultratop Flanders)	2
Belgian Albums (Ultratop Wallonia)	1
Canadian Albums (Billboard)	14
Croatian International Albums (HDU)	1
Czech Republic Singles Digital (ČNS IFPI)	46 (Note: Per Czech chart rules, albums of five tracks or fewer chart on the singles chart.)
Danish Albums (Hitlisten)	18
Finnish Albums (Suomen virallinen lista)	16
France (SNEP)	3 (Note: Per French chart rules, albums of five tracks or fewer chart on the singles chart.)
German Albums (Offizielle Top 100)	3
German Pop Albums (Offizielle Top 100)	2
Greek Albums (IFPI)	2
Hungarian Albums (MAHASZ)	1
Icelandic Albums (Tónlistinn)	5
Japanese Albums (Oricon)	3
Japanese Combined Albums (Oricon)	3
Japanese Hot Albums (Billboard Japan)	12
New Zealand Albums (RMNZ)	23
Portuguese Albums (AFP)	20
Portuguese Albums (AFP) It version	2
Slovakia Singles Digital (ČNS IFPI)	52 (Note: Per Slovak chart rules, albums of five tracks or fewer chart on the singles chart.)
South Korean Albums (Circle)	1
Spanish Albums (Promusicae)	41
Swedish Albums (Sverigetopplistan)	29
Swiss Albums (Schweizer Hitparade)	2
US Billboard 200	1
US World Albums (Billboard)	1

=== Monthly charts ===
Monthly chart performance for Do It
Chart (2025)	Position
Japanese Albums (Oricon)	6
South Korean Albums (Circle)	1

=== Year-end charts ===
Year-end chart performance for Do It
Chart (2025)	Position
Austrian Albums (Ö3 Austria)	50
Belgian Albums (Ultratop Flanders)	161
Belgian Albums (Ultratop Wallonia)	158
Hungarian Albums (MAHASZ)	28
Japanese Albums (Oricon)	59
Japanese Download Albums (Billboard Japan)	88
South Korean Albums (Circle)	3
Swiss Albums (Schweizer Hitparade)	94

== Certifications ==
Certifications for Do It
Region	Certification	Certified units/sales
France (SNEP)	Gold	100,000^{‡}
South Korea (KMCA)	2× Million	2,000,000^{^}
South Korea (KMCA) Nemo	Platinum	250,000^{^}
^{^} Shipments figures based on certification alone.

== Release history ==
Release dates and formats for Do It
Region	Date	Format	Version	Label	Ref.
Various	November 21, 2025	Digital download; streaming	Standard	JYP; Republic	
Various	November 21, 2025	CD	Limited; standard	JYP; Republic	
South Korea	November 21, 2025	Plve	Platform Plve	JYP; Republic	
United States	November 25, 2025	Digital download	Exclusive digital	JYP; Republic	
South Korea	December 26, 2025	Speaker	Devil SKZoo Speaker	JYP; Republic	

== See also ==
- List of Billboard 200 number-one albums of 2025
- List of Circle Album Chart number ones of 2025
- List of number-one albums of 2025 (Belgium)
- List of number-one hits of 2025 (Austria)
