= This & That (song) =

- This Remixes cover

Single by Stray Kids

from the EP This & That
- Language: Korean; English
- Released: August 7, 2026
- Studio: JYPE (Seoul)
- Genre: Hip-hop
- Length: 3:05
- Label: JYP; Republic
- Songwriters: Bang Chan; Changbin; Han; Stefan Johnson; Jordan K. Johnson; Jackson Foote; Tele; Rayman; Isaiah Tejada

Stray Kids singles chronology
"Run It" (2026)	"This & That" (2026)

Music video
- "This & That" on YouTube

"This & That" is a song by South Korean boy band Stray Kids from their tenth Korean-language EP of the same name (2026). It was released as the EP's lead single on August 7, 2026, by JYP Entertainment and Republic Records. Commercially, the song peaked at number 35 on the Circle Digital Chart and number 38 on the Billboard Hot 100, the latter of which was their highest peak to date.

== Background and release ==
On June 22, 2026, Stray Kids announced their tenth Korean-language EP, titled This & That, through a teaser video for its lead single, "Run It". The official trailer later came on July 8. The EP's track list was posted the next two days, confirming "This & That" as its lead single and the song's "Festival" version. The band first teased the song, alongside the other tracks, through the EP's mashup video on July 24. The song was released alongside its parent EP on August 7. The remixes EPs, titled This Remixes and That Remixes, were released on August 10 and 12, respectively.

As told in the Intro "This & That" video, "This & That" is the song that took the longest to refine on the EP. Changbin also revealed that he "put a lot of effort into finding suitable words to express 'this' and 'that'." At the EP's press conference, Stray Kids felt that "This & That" would be the lead single ever since they were working on the song in the United States.

== Production and composition ==
"This & That" was written by Stray Kids' in-house production team 3Racha—Bang Chan, Changbin, and Han—alongside Stefan and Jordan K. Johnson, Jackson Foote, Tele, Rayman, and Isaiah Tejada. A hip-hop track with repetitive of "this and that" and nearly mumble rap delivery, the song talks about their composure and confidence that anything can be possible. The lyrics list different choices—fast or slow, hot or cold, coupe or truck, and cappuccino or americano—and they choose both. "This & That" departs from the band's previous maximalist lead singles, which is more relaxed and approachable by toning down some of the "rougher" elements from the band's earlier music, and more "experimental". The song is built primarily around two chords—D♭m and Cm—in the key of C minor, oscillating between them.

== Music video ==
An accompanying music video for "This & That" premiered on August 7, 2026, alongside the single and EP release, and was preceded by a teaser video. Filmed for five days, the "cinematic" visuals shows Stray Kids performs in various locations, including apartment, stairwell, kitchen and theater, Centered on the idea of contrasting, it incorporates Korean-styled settings and elements, and striks visual contrasts between dark backdrops and neon lights and surreal digital effects. The video surpassed 100 million views on YouTube in September 2026, becoming the band's 22nd music video to reach this milestones.

== Live performances ==
Upon its release, Stray Kids promoted and performed "This & That" at various domestic music shows for two weeks: Music Bank, Show! Music Core, and scheduled for Inkigayo. The band also performed the song at SBS Gayo Daejeon: Summer on August 9, and the 2026 TMELive International Music Awards. The song was later included on the regular setlist of the band's Run It World Tour since the Tokyo shows.

== Accolades ==
List of awards and nominations received by "This & That"
Ceremony	Year	Category	Result	Ref.
Korea Grand Music Awards	2026	Best Music	Nominated	
Korea Grand Music Awards	2026	Best Music Video	Nominated	
MAMA Awards	2026	Best Dance Performance – Male Group	Nominated	

Music program awards for "This & That"
Program	Date	Ref.
Inkigayo	August 23, 2026	
M Countdown	August 13, 2026	
M Countdown	August 20, 2026	
Music Bank	August 14, 2026	
Music Bank	August 21, 2026	
Show Champion	August 19, 2026	

== Track listing ==
- CD single (Group version)
1. "This & That" – 3:05
2. "This & That" (Festival version; with Tele) – 3:42
- CD single (Unit #1 version)
1. "This & That" – 3:05
2. "This & That" (Festival version; instrumental) – 3:42
- CD single (Unit #2 version) and LP
1. "This & That" – 3:05
2. "This & That" (instrumental) – 3:05
- Cassette
1. "This & That" – 3:05
2. "This & That" (slowed + reverb)
- Digital download and streaming (This Remixes)
1. "This & That" – 3:05
2. "This & That" (This version; with Benjamin 55) – 2:59
3. "This & That" (Chill version; with Imlay) – 3:08
4. "This & That" (instrumental) – 3:05
- Digital download and streaming (That Remixes)
1. "This & That" – 3:05
2. "This & That" (That version; with Cesar Peralta) – 3:05
3. "This & That" (Cool version; with Will Not Fear, Minit) – 2:33
4. "This & That" (instrumental) – 3:05

== Credits and personnel ==
Personnel

- Stray Kids – lead vocals, background vocals
  - Bang Chan (3Racha) – lyrics, composition, arrangement, instruments, computer programming
  - Changbin (3Racha) – lyrics, composition
  - Han (3Racha) – lyrics, composition
- Jackson Foote – background vocals, lyrics, composition
- The Monsters & Strangerz – lyrics, composition, arrangement, instruments, computer programming
  - Stefan Johnson – digital editing
- Tele – lyrics, composition, arrangement, instruments, computer programming
- Rayman – lyrics, composition, arrangement, instruments, computer programming
- Isaiah Tejada – lyrics, composition, arrangement, instruments, computer programming
- Choi Hye-jin – recording
- Goo Hye-jin – digital editing
- Manny Marroquin – mixing
- Chris Galland – mix engineering
  - Ramiro Fernandez-Seoane – assistant
- Kwon Nam-woo – mastering
- Lee Ha-neul – mixing and mastering in Dolby Atmos

Locations

- JYPE Studios – recording, digital editing
- Larrabee Studios – mixing
- 821 Sound Mastering – mastering
- BK Studio – mixing and mastering in Dolby Atmos

== Charts ==
=== Weekly charts ===
Weekly chart performance for "This & That"
Chart (2026)	Peak position
Australia (ARIA)	76
Austria (Ö3 Austria Top 40)	62
Canada Hot 100 (Billboard)	77
Czech Republic Singles Digital (ČNS IFPI)	60
El Salvador Anglo Airplay (Monitor Latino)	8
France (SNEP) That version	172
Germany (GfK)	48
Global 200 (Billboard)	25
Japan Hot 100 (Billboard)	51
Japan Streaming (Oricon)	47
Netherlands (Single Tip)	11
New Zealand Hot Singles (RMNZ)	3
Portugal (AFP)	136
Romania Airplay (TopHit)	97
Singapore Regional (RIAS)	8
Slovakia Singles Digital (ČNS IFPI)	56
South Korea (Circle)	35
Switzerland (Schweizer Hitparade)	98
Taiwan (Billboard)	18
UK Singles (Official Charts)	61
UK Hip Hop/R&B (Official Charts)	15
UK Independent (Official Charts)	13
US Billboard Hot 100	38

=== Monthly charts ===
Monthly chart performance for "This & That"
Chart (2026)	Peak position
South Korea (Circle)	90

== Release history ==
Release dates and formats for "This & That"
Region	Date	Format	Version	Label	Ref.
Various	August 7, 2026	Digital download; streaming	Original; Festival	JYP; Republic	
United States	August 7, 2026	CD	Original; Festival	JYP; Republic	
United States	August 7, 2026	CD	Original; Festival instrumental	JYP; Republic	
United States	August 7, 2026	CD	Original; instrumental	JYP; Republic	
United States	August 7, 2026	Cassette	Original; slowed + reverb	JYP; Republic	
United States	August 7, 2026	LP	Original; instrumental	JYP; Republic	
Various	August 10, 2026	Digital download; streaming	This Remixes	JYP; Republic	
Various	August 12, 2026	Digital download; streaming	That Remixes	JYP; Republic	
