= Run It World Tour =

2026–2027 concert tour by Stray Kids

- World tour by Stray Kids
- Seoul promotional poster
- Location: Asia; North America; Europe
- Associated albums: This & That; Suiatsu
- Start date: July 25, 2026
- End date: July 31, 2027
- Legs: 3
- No. of shows: 51

Stray Kids concert chronology
- Dominate World Tour (2024–2025); Run It World Tour (2026–2027)

The Run It World Tour (officially Stray Kids World Tour <Run It>) is the ongoing fourth world tour and fifth overall concert tour by South Korean boy band Stray Kids, in support of their tenth Korean-language EP This & That and fifth Japanese-language EP Suiatsu (2026). The 51-show tour commenced in Seoul, South Korea, on July 25, 2026, and is set to conclude in Milan, Italy, on July 31, 2027

== Background and marketing ==
On January 1, 2026, Stray Kids uploaded the video "Step Out 2026", outlining their 2025 accomplishments and plans for 2026, including a concert tour. On June 22, 2026, on the teaser video for the single "Run It", the band announced the world tour, titled Run It. The next day, the first leg dates were unveiled, being in South Korea, Japan, Hong Kong, Taiwan, Thailand, and Singapore. The band became the first foreign male artist to host a concert at Japan National Stadium (MUFG Stadium). On June 26, the tour's group and individual teaser posters were posted.

Ticket sales for the band's official fan club and general audiences for Seoul shows began on June 30 and July 1, respectively, and were reported to have "immediately" sold out. Ticket sales for the Hong Kong, Thailand, Singapore, and Taiwan shows began in August and September. At the second show at Japan National Stadium, the band announced the additional Tokyo three shows, taking place at Tokyo Dome on November 6 to 8. The November 7 show was broadcast live in cinemas worldwide, and was distributed by Trafalgar Releasing.

On November 9, 2026, Stray Kids announced 25 further shows in Japan, North America, and Europe. The Nissan Stadium shows will make the band the first international male act to hold solo concerts at this venue. Five additional shows in Chicago, Paris, London, Munich, and Arnhem were added. The member Lee Know will not participate in these shows due to his mandatory military service during the first quarter of 2027.

== Setlist ==
This setlist is representative of the show in Seoul on July 25, 2026. It is not intended to represent all shows.

1. "Hall of Fame"
2. "Hellevator"
3. "District 9"
4. "Miroh" + "Levanter" + "I Am You"
5. "Side Effects"
6. "Double Knot"
7. "Back Door"
8. "Maniac"
9. "God's Menu"
10. "Creed"
11. "Slash"
12. "Divine"
13. "Thunderous"
14. "In My Head"
15. "I Do"
16. "Blind Spot"
17. "Bleep"
18. "Do It"
19. "Lalalala"
20. "Ceremony"
21. "Chk Chk Boom"
22. "S-Class"
23. "Run It"
24. "Stray Kids"
25. "Phoenix"
26. "After You"
27. "Social Path"
28. "Miroh"

Encore

29. "Topline"
30. "Star Lost"

== Tour dates ==
List of 2026 concerts, showing date, city, country, venue, and attendance
Date (2026)	City	Country	Venue	Attendance
July 25	Seoul	South Korea	KSPO Dome	—
July 26 (Note: The July 26 and August 2 shows were streamed simultaneously via Beyond Live.)	Seoul	South Korea	KSPO Dome	—
July 29	Seoul	South Korea	KSPO Dome	—
August 1	Seoul	South Korea	KSPO Dome	—
August 2	Seoul	South Korea	KSPO Dome	—
August 29	Tokyo	Japan	MUFG Stadium	520,000
August 30 (Note: The August 30 show was streamed via Hulu Japan and broadcast live through cinemas in Japan by Live Viewing.)	Tokyo	Japan	MUFG Stadium	520,000
September 5	Nagoya	Japan	Vantelin Dome Nagoya	520,000
September 6	Nagoya	Japan	Vantelin Dome Nagoya	520,000
September 19	Osaka	Japan	Kyocera Dome Osaka	520,000
September 20	Osaka	Japan	Kyocera Dome Osaka	520,000
October 24	Fukuoka	Japan	Mizuho PayPay Dome Fukuoka	520,000
November 6	Tokyo	Japan	Tokyo Dome	520,000
November 7 (Note: The November 7 show broadcast as live viewing in cinemas, and was streamed simultaneously via Lemino, Wowow Prime, and Wowow On Demand.)	Tokyo	Japan	Tokyo Dome	520,000
November 8 (Note: The November 8 show was streamed simultaneously via Beyond Live.)	Tokyo	Japan	Tokyo Dome	520,000
December 5	Hong Kong	China	Kai Tak Stadium	—
December 12	Taipei	Taiwan	Taipei Dome	—

List of 2027 concerts, showing date, city, country, and venue
Date (2027)	City	Country	Venue
January 16	Pak Kret (Note: Labelled as Bangkok in promotional material.)	Thailand	Impact Arena
January 17	Pak Kret	Thailand	Impact Arena
March 6	Singapore		Singapore Indoor Stadium
March 7	Singapore		Singapore Indoor Stadium
April 24	Yokohama	Japan	Nissan Stadium
April 25	Yokohama	Japan	Nissan Stadium
May 4	Osaka	Japan	Yanmar Stadium Nagai
May 5	Osaka	Japan	Yanmar Stadium Nagai
May 16	Seattle	United States	Lumen Field
May 19	Vancouver	Canada	BC Place
May 22	Santa Clara	United States	Levi's Stadium
May 25	San Diego	United States	Petco Park
May 29	Inglewood (Note: Labelled as Los Angeles in promotional material.)	United States	SoFi Stadium
June 3	Arlington	United States	AT&T Stadium
June 5	Houston	United States	Reliant Stadium
June 8	Atlanta	United States	Mercedes-Benz Stadium
June 11	Miami Gardens (Note: Labelled as Miami in promotional material.)	United States	Hard Rock Stadium
June 14	Orlando	United States	Camping World Stadium
June 18	Chicago	United States	Soldier Field
June 19	Chicago	United States	Soldier Field
June 22	Baltimore	United States	M&T Bank Stadium
June 25	Toronto	Canada	Rogers Stadium
June 29	East Rutherford	United States	MetLife Stadium
July 9	Paris	France	Plenitude Arena
July 10	Paris	France	Plenitude Arena
July 13	London	England	Tottenham Hotspur Stadium
July 14	London	England	Tottenham Hotspur Stadium
July 17	Munich	Germany	Allianz Arena
July 18	Munich	Germany	Allianz Arena
July 21	Vienna	Austria	Ernst-Happel-Stadion
July 24	Barcelona	Spain	Estadi Olímpic Lluís Companys
July 27	Arnhem	Netherlands	GelreDome
July 28	Arnhem	Netherlands	GelreDome
July 31	Milan	Italy	San Siro
