= This & That (EP) =

- Digital cover

EP by Stray Kids
- Released: August 7, 2026
- Studios: JYPE (Seoul); Channie's "Room" (Seoul)
- Length: 25:11
- Languages: Korean; English
- Labels: JYP; Republic
- Producers: 3Racha; Chae Gang-hae; German; Helixx (Vendors); Jun2; The Monsters & Strangerz; Rayman; Restart; Isaiah Tejada; Tele; Versachoi

Stray Kids chronology
SKZ-Replay 2026 Pt.1 (2026)	This & That (2026)	Suiatsu (2026)

Singles from This & That
- 1. "Run It" Released: June 24, 2026; 2. "This & That" Released: August 7, 2026

This & That is the tenth Korean-language extended play (sixteen overall) by South Korean boy band Stray Kids. It was released on August 7, 2026, through JYP Entertainment and Republic Records. The EP is a follow-up to the band's second mixtape, Do It (2025), and spawned two singles—"Run It" and the title track. In support of the EP, the band embarked on their Run It World Tour from 2026 to 2027.

Commercially, This & That peaked at number one on the Circle Album Chart in South Korea, with three million copies sold, and also topped the national charts in Austria, Belgium (both Flanders and Wallonia), France, Greece, Hungary, Italy, Japan, the Netherlands, Poland, Switzerland, and the United States, and was certified triple million by the Korea Music Content Association (KMCA) and gold by the SNEP.

== Background ==
In 2025, Stray Kids released their fourth Korean-language studio album, Karma, and the second mixtape, Do It. The albums expanded the records for the first act ever to top the Billboard 200 with their first eight entries. The former became the best-selling 2025 album in South Korea, earning 3.03 million copies. Additionally, the band featured on French record producer DJ Snake's track "In the Dark" from his third studio album Nomad (2025). The International Federation of the Phonographic Industry (IFPI) reported that Stray Kids was the second best-selling artist worldwide in 2025, behind only Taylor Swift.

On January 1, 2026, Stray Kids uploaded the video "Step Out 2026", outlining their 2025 accomplishments and plans for 2026, including a new album. On March 12, JYP Entertainment released a statement about the member Seungmin's suffering from stress fracture in his left ankle. On July 2, JYP further revealed that Seungmin would absent from filming some content for the upcoming release due to an ongoing injury, which is taking longer than expected to heal.

== Music and lyrics ==
The tracks on This & That incorporates elements of various genres, including hip-hop, electronic, and pop music. Stray Kids' in-house production team, 3Racha, consisting of Bang Chan, Changbin, and Han, co-wrote all tracks, showcasing their versatile side and justified confidence to do "this" and "that", and reflecting their own experiences of growth, challenges, relationships, comfort, as well as hustle culture, loyalty, nostalgia, etc., which is more personal than its predecessors.

=== Songs ===
The EP opens with "Run It", a pop and alternative hip-hop track, incorporating a worldbeat rhythm and driven by brass instruments and marching drums. It conveys the message of "unstoppable progress and the confidence of racing toward victory" from "small room" to "the world". The title track, "This & That", is a hip-hop track that speaks of their composure and confidence that anything can be possible, with departing from the band's previous lead singles' sound with more chill and relaxed sounds. "After You", a dance-, electropop, and progressive house song, expresses the moment of falling in love at first sight. Inspired by the slang "aura farming", and the gaming term of the same name, "Farming" is an electroclash featuring hip-hop and electronic sounds, synth riff, and shuffle rhythm. It depicts the process of moving toward their goals until they are satisfied. Billboard's Jeff Benjamin noted that the song recalls Missy Elliott and Timbaland.

"I Do" offers comfort and encouragement in times of loneliness with pop and rock sound and retro-styled melody. An acoustic hip-hop and electro-R&B song with trap beats and guitar strumming, "Way Out" captures the understated emotions of a breakup, featuring "good-bye" in Japanese, Spanish, Korean, and French: "sayonara (さようなら), adiós, jal ga (잘 가), au revoir", with a "cold, sharp" tone, but guitar creates "warm, inviting atmosphere". The 1980s and 2000s-styled alternative pop "Back Then" inspired by a television series Han watched, Our Beloved Summer (2021), and talks about the sentiment of looking back on moments spent with a past love. This & That concluded with the "Festival" version of the title track.

== Release and promotion ==
On June 22, Stray Kids announced their tenth Korean-language EP, titled This & That, alongside its pre-save, set to be released on August 7, 2026, as well as its supporting Run It World Tour, through a teaser video for "Run It". The band surprisingly uploaded the video, "Test", on July 6. Adopting the format from Yoo Byung-jae's web show Hate Scary Stuff, the video features Yoo hosts the show and monitors Stray Kids—except Seungmin—exploring an abandoned house from a first-person camcorder perspective via laptop. After an abnormal situation, Yoo suddenly glitches and switches to Seungmin's appearance. The truck's tailgate closes, and its license plate displays the EP's title.

The EP's official trailer was released and physical formats pre-orders began on July 8. The "cinematic" and "surreal" video begins with a protagonist receiving an LP from Seungmin and walking into a mysterious truck. After the music is played, he is drawn into the "unreal" world, where everyone bear the faces of Stray Kids in each situation—Bang Chan as barista, Lee Know as photographer, Changbin as chef, Hyunjin as dancer, Han as auctioneer, Felix as bakery clerk, and I.N as waiter—and the conversation is limited to only "this" and "that". The next day, the band posted the EP's 3D-animated promotional itinerary, showing stickers stuck on orange boxes pouring out from the door-opening This & That truck.

The track list for This & That was revealed on July 10. The image features coffee cascading from eight paper cups, each inscribed with the song's title, credits, roast levels, tasting scores, and track mood hints. The video version depicts coffee pouring out alongside the song titles. The EP's four sets of concept images were teased. The first depicts the members with the coffee concept, including props such as cups of coffee, bread, and LPs. The second set features each member wearing white inside decorated trucks. The third depicts "vintage yet kitschy" Y2K styling with the members in mint-colored outfits. The final set showcases each member's "vintage yet sophisticated" photograph with various shooting techniques, such as flash, shaky frames, and rough cropping. Stray Kids teased the EP's tracks through the video series "Unveil: Track" for "Farming", "After You", and "Back Then", and street-styled retro EDM mashup on café-styled animated video.

During the pre-release promotion, Stray Kids held the "2026 StayWeek" from July 26 to August 1 to commemorate the eighth anniversary of their official fan club Stay. Its contents include a short-form drama, behind-the-scenes, a livestream, a vlog, and the compilation album SKZ-Replay 2026 Pt.1. On August 4, the band uploaded the video, Intro "This & That", to discuss the album's production and behind-the-scenes. The next two days, the band held the EP's press conference and the "Listening Gallery" in partnership with Apple Music in Seoul. Stray Kids and Soundwave launched the EP's pop-up store at the Gabae Seongsu, Seoul, from August 8 to 20. Bang Chan, Changbin, and Han hosted the six-episode Spotify podcast, 3Racha Session, The band appeared on several web shows during the promotion: Fake Kim Hyoyeon, Melon's Global K-Chart Fansewer, Glamour, Spotify's Shuffle Live, YouTube's K-bongbakdu, Workman's Work-dol, Matchunda Kany, Zip Daesung, Sana's Fridge Interview, etc.

=== Singles and music videos ===
Self-described the song as their "new anthem", "Run It" was released as pre-released single for This & That on June 24, 2026. Sam Son directed the song's accompanying music video. The title track was released as the EP's lead single alongside its parent EP on August 7. Its music video premiered the same day, directed by Bang Jae-yeob. The song peaked at number 35 on the Circle Digital Chart, and reached number 38 on the Billboard Hot 100, their highest peaked to date. Other music videos include Seungmin's "Song By" version of "Back Then", "After You", and "Farming".

=== Tour and performances ===
The Run It World Tour supported the promotion of This & That. It ran for five days at KSPO Dome in Seoul, South Korea, on July 25–26, 29, and August 1–2; they debuted the EP's tracks, "I Do" and "After You", before the official release. The tour's first leg travelled through various Asian countries. To promote the EP on domestic music shows, Stray Kids performed "This & That" for two weeks at Music Bank, Show! Music Core, and scheduled for Inkigayo. The band participated in SBS Gayo Daejeon: Summer on August 9 to perform "This & That", alongside "Ceremony", "Chk Chk Boom", and "Miroh". Furthermore, the band performed songs from the EP at the music festivals Rock in Rio and their own StrayCity in Latin America.

== Critical reception ==
Professional ratings
Review scores
Source	Rating
AllMusic	4/5 stars

TV Daily wrote that This & That "expands Stray Kids' unique genre in the freest and most relaxed way possible," and "retains the group's characteristic raw charm while achieving an even greater level of polish and cohesion," as well as "dialing back the intensity to focus on the groove, with their confidence shining through in the song's subtle variations." Park Hye-jin from Dispatch noted that the EP "takes a step closer to the general public" with more catchy sound, while the music remains experimental. Similarly, Cho Sung-jin of Sports Hankook felt This & That was "softer" than Stray Kids' predecessors and believed it could be a "major turning point" for the group. AllMusic's Neil Z. Yeung called the EP "another reliable Stray Kids effort".

== Commercial performance ==
According to Hanteo Chart, This & That sold 1,895,617 copies between August 3 and 9, 2026, and 3.28 million in its first week, an increase of about 8% from the previous 3.04 million copies of Karma. With two-day tracking, the EP debuted at number one on the Circle Album Chart dated August 2–8, 2026, earning 3,475,460 copies, which consists of 3,124,490 CDs, 300,000 Fans albums, and 50,970 LPs. The Korea Music Content Association (KMCA) certified This & That triple million in October. In Japan, the EP reached number one on the Oricon Albums Chart and Combined Albums Chart dated August 24, selling 104,000 copies. Elsewhere, This & That topped the national album charts in various regions, including Austria, Belgium, France, Italy, the Netherlands, and Switzerland, and reached top-five in Australia, Germany, etc. The EP received gold certification by the Syndicat national de l'édition phonographique (SNEP).

In the United States, This & That debuted at number one on the Billboard 200 for the issue dated August 22, 2026. The ninth US number-one album, it extended the record for the first act to debut the first nine entries at number one on the chart, and the second most number-one album in the US by a group act, tying with the Rolling Stones, and behind the Beatles (19). Topped the Top Album Sales, it earned 369,000 album-equivalent units in its first week, including 357,000 pure sales and 12.21 million on-demand streams, becoming their biggest sales week in the US and the second biggest in 2026, behind only 532,000 units of BTS's Arirang. The EP also peaked at number one on the specific-genre World Albums for two consecutive weeks.

== Accolades ==
List of awards and nominations for This & That
Ceremony	Year	Category	Result	Ref.
MAMA Awards	2026	Album of the Year	Nominated	

== Track listing ==
This & That track listing
No.	Title	Lyrics	Music	Arrangement	Length
1.	"Run It"	Bang Chan (3Racha); Changbin (3Racha); Han (3Racha); Marcus "MarcLo" Lomax	Bang Chan; Changbin; Han; Lomax; Versachoi	Versachoi; Bang Chan	3:29
2.	"This & That"	Bang Chan; Changbin; Han; Stefan Johnson; Jordan K. Johnson; Jackson Foote; Tele; Rayman; Isaiah Tejada	Bang Chan; Changbin; Han; S. Johnson; J. Johnson; Foote; Tele; Rayman; Tejada	The Monsters & Strangerz; Tele; Rayman; Tejada; Bang Chan	3:05
3.	"After You"	Bang Chan; Changbin; Han; S. Johnson; J. Johnson; Foote; Oliver Peterhof	Bang Chan; Changbin; Han; S. Johnson; J. Johnson; Foote; Oliver Peterhof	The Monsters & Strangerz & German	2:52
4.	"Farming"	Bang Chan; Changbin; Han	Bang Chan; Changbin; Han; Restart; Chae Gang-hae	Restart; Chae; Bang Chan	2:31
5.	"I Do"	Changbin	Changbin; Restart; Chae	Restart; Chae	2:53
6.	"Way Out"	Bang Chan; Changbin	Bang Chan; Changbin; Jun2	Jun2; Bang Chan	2:54
7.	"Back Then" (그날)	Han	Han; Vendors (Helixx)	Helixx	3:45
8.	"This & That" (Festival version; with Tele)	Bang Chan; Changbin; Han; S. Johnson; J. Johnson; Foote; Tele; Rayman; Tejada	Bang Chan; Changbin; Han; S. Johnson; J. Johnson; Foote; Tele; Rayman; Tejada	The Monsters & Strangerz; Tejada; Tele; Rayman; Bang Chan	3:42
Total length:					25:11

Cool edition bonus tracks
No.	Title	Length
9.	"This & That" (Cool version; with Will Not Fear and Minit)	2:33
10.	"This & That" (instrumental)	3:05
11.	"This & That" (Cool edition voice memo)	1:43
12.	"This & That" (Cool edition video)	2:33
Total length:		35:05

Chill edition bonus tracks
No.	Title	Length
9.	"This & That" (Chill version; with Imlay)	3:08
10.	"This & That" (instrumental)	3:05
11.	"This & That" (Chill edition voice memo)	1:44
12.	"This & That" (Chill edition video)	3:08
Total length:		36:16

== Credits and personnel ==
=== Musicians ===
- Stray Kids – lead vocals (all), background vocals (all)
  - Bang Chan (3Racha) – instruments (1–2, 4, 6), computer programming (1–2, 4, 6)
- Versachoi – instruments (1), computer programming (1)
- Jackson Foote – background vocals (2–3, 8)
- The Monsters & Strangerz – instruments (2–3), computer programming (2–3)
- Isaiah Tejada – instruments (2), computer programming (2)
- Tele – instruments (2, 8), computer programming (2, 8)
- Rayman – instruments (2), computer programming (2)
- German – instruments (3), computer programming (3)
- Restart – instruments (4–5), computer programming (4–5)
- Chae Gang-hae – instruments (4–5), computer programming (4–5)
- Lee Dong-jun – guitar (5)
- Jun2 – instruments (6), computer programming (6)
- Vendors (Helixx) – drums (7), bass (7), computer programming (7)
- Vendors (Zenur) – guitar (7)
- Im Young-woo – piano (7)

=== Technical ===
- Lee Sang-yeob – recording (1, 6)
- Bang Chan (3Racha) – recording (1, 4, 6), digital editing (1, 3)
- Choi Hye-jin – recording (2, 8)
- Eom Se-hee – recording (3–4, 7)
- Lee Chang-hoon – recording (5)
- Kwak Bo-eun – recording (7)
- Lee Kyeong-won – digital editing (1, 4)
- Versachoi – digital editing (1)
- Goo Hye-jin – digital editing (2, 6, 8)
- Stefan Johnson – digital editing (2–3), mixing (3)
- Restart – digital editing (5)
- Kim Min-seok – digital editing (7)
- Yoon Won-kwon – mixing (1, 4–5)
- Manny Marroquin – mixing (2)
- Louis. K – mixing (3, 6, 8), mixing and mastering in Dolby Atmos (6)
- Stay Tuned – mixing (7)
- Chris Galland – mix engineering (2)
  - Ramiro Fernandez-Seoane – assistant (2)
- Kwon Nam-woo – mastering (all)
- Lee Ha-neul – mixing and mastering in Dolby Atmos (1–5, 7–8)

=== Locations ===
- JYPE Studios – recording (all), digital editing (2, 6, 8)
- Channie's "Room" – recording (1, 4, 6), digital editing (1, 3)
- Salpotstudios – digital editing (7)
- MadMiix – mixing (1, 4–5)
- Larrabee Studios – mixing (2)
- Ritz Lab Studio – mixing (3, 6, 8), mixing and mastering in Dolby Atmos (6)
- Stay Tuned Studio – mixing (7)
- 821 Sound Mastering – mastering (all)
- BK Studio – mixing and mastering in Dolby Atmos (1–5, 7–8)

== Charts ==
=== Weekly charts ===
Weekly chart performance for This & That
Chart (2026)	Peak position
Australian Albums (ARIA)	3
Austrian Albums (Ö3 Austria)	1
Belgian Albums (Ultratop Flanders)	1
Belgian Albums (Ultratop Wallonia)	1
Canadian Albums (Billboard)	9
Croatian International Albums (HDU)	1
Czech Albums (ČNS IFPI)	19
Danish Albums (Hitlisten)	4
Dutch Albums (Album Top 100)	1
Finnish Albums (Suomen virallinen lista)	3
French Albums (SNEP)	1
German Albums (Offizielle Top 100)	2
German Pop Albums (Offizielle Top 100)	1
Greek Albums (IFPI)	1
Hungarian Albums (MAHASZ)	1
Irish Albums (IRMA)	75
Irish Independent Albums (IRMA)	14
Italian Albums (FIMI)	1
Japanese Albums (Oricon)	1
Japanese Combined Albums (Oricon)	1
Japanese Hot Albums (Billboard Japan)	6
Lithuanian Albums (AGATA)	18
New Zealand Albums (RMNZ)	7
Norwegian Albums (VG-lista)	14
Polish Albums (ZPAV)	1
Portuguese Albums (AFP)	2
Scottish Albums (Official Charts)	16
South Korean Albums (Circle)	1
Spanish Albums (Promusicae)	2
Swedish Albums (Sverigetopplistan)	5
Swiss Albums (Schweizer Hitparade)	1
UK Albums (Official Charts)	80
UK Independent Albums (Official Charts)	10
US Billboard 200	1
US World Albums (Billboard)	1

=== Monthly charts ===
Monthly chart performance for This & That
Chart (2026)	Peak position
Japanese Albums (Oricon)	2
South Korean Albums (Circle)	1

== Certifications ==
Certifications for This & That
Region	Certification	Certified units/sales
France (SNEP)	Gold	50,000^{‡}
South Korea (KMCA)	3× Million	3,000,000^{^}
South Korea (KMCA) Fans	2× Platinum	500,000^{^}
^{‡} Sales+streaming figures based on certification alone.

== Release history ==
Release dates and formats for This & That
Region	Date	Format	Version	Label	Ref.
Various	August 7, 2026	CD; mini CD; vinyl LP; digital download; streaming	Limited; standard	JYP; Republic	
South Korea	August 7, 2026	Digital download	Fans Album	JYP; Republic	
United States	August 7, 2026	Digital download	Exclusive digital	JYP; Republic	
Various	August 8, 2026	Digital download	Cool; Chill	JYP; Republic	
South Korea	October 22, 2026	Digital download	Market SKZoo	JYP; Republic	
