= Jeon Woo-chi (TV series) =

2012 South Korean TV series

- Promotional poster
- Hangul: 전우치
- Hanja: 田禹治
- RR: Jeon Uchi
- MR: Chŏn Uch'i
- Genre: Historical; Fantasy; Comedy; Romance
- Written by: Jo Myung-joo; Park Dae-young
- Directed by: Kang Il-soo; Park Jin-seok
- Starring: Cha Tae-hyun; Uee; Lee Hee-joon; Baek Jin-hee; Kim Kap-soo
- Music by: Lee Pil-ho
- Country of origin: South Korea
- Original language: Korean
- No. of episodes: 24

Production
- Producer: Park Hyeon-seok
- Production location: Korea
- Cinematography: Kim Yong-soo; Kang Jang-soo
- Editor: Seon Han-saem
- Running time: 60 minutes Wednesdays and Thursdays at 21:55 (KST)
- Production company: Chorokbaem Media

Original release
- Network: KBS2
- Release: 21 November 2012 – 7 February 2013

Jeon Woo-chi (Korean: 전우치) is a 2012 South Korean fantasy period television series, starring Cha Tae-hyun as the titular Taoist wizard who becomes an unlikely hero to the people of Joseon. It is based on the same folktale as the 2009 movie of the same name, but has a different story. Also starring Uee, Lee Hee-joon, Baek Jin-hee, Kim Kap-soo and Sung Dong-il, it aired on KBS2 from November 21, 2012 to February 7, 2013 on Wednesdays and Thursdays at 22:00 for 24 episodes.

== Synopsis ==
In the fictional utopian nation of Yuldo, established by the righteous bandit hero Hong Gil-dong, Jeon Woo-chi is a dosa, a Taoist wizard, who gained his powers by swallowing a gumiho fox bead. A friend's betrayal causes him to lose his mentor, and sorcery turns the love of his life Hong Mu-yeon into an emotionless assassin. So in order to avenge them, he travels to Joseon, and is moved by the plight of the people and becomes a reluctant hero to them.

== Cast and characters ==
- Cha Tae-hyun as Jeon Woo-chi / Lee Chi, a mischievous, confident wizard who's always chasing women. He doesn't seem like he amounts to much, but that's all an act; he just adopts that persona so that people will underestimate him. He lives a cover life as Lee Chi, a wimpy reporter for the local newspaper who runs away at the first sign of trouble. Though he only cares about his own revenge mission, Woo-chi keeps getting entangled in the citizens' problems. He finds it all annoying, but the more he helps, the more they start to see him as a hero. It's the last thing he wants, but perhaps a fate he can't avoid.
- Uee as Hong Mu-yeon, Hong Gil-dong's granddaughter, princess of Yuldo. She learned wizardry along with Woo-chi, and is brave and strong-willed, and doesn't flinch in the face of death. Ma Sook puts her under a spell that erases her memory and controls her mind, taking her away to use her as a weapon against the Joseon people. But once a month, the energy from the Moon weakens the spell, and she remembers and longs for Woo-chi.
- Lee Hee-joon as Ma Kang-rim, Woo-chi's nemesis. He grew up with both Mu-yeon and Woo-chi in Yuldo. Kang-rim loved Mu-yeon, but always ended up second best in everything, including winning her heart. He chooses to betray them, setting the story in motion.
- Baek Jin-hee as Lee Hye-ryung, who is searching for her brother Lee Chi. Lee Chi's been missing for some time, so when Woo-chi takes on his identity, Hye-ryung thinks she's found her long-lost oppa after all this time. Now he has to keep her fooled and thinking that he's her brother, when he's really not.
- Kim Kap-soo as Ma Sook, a powerful wizard and Kang-rim's uncle. He was once a follower of Hong Gil-dong and part of the group Hwalbindang, but has betrayed Yuldo and set his sights to loftier kingdoms: He wants to conquer Joseon.
- Sung Dong-il as Bong-goo, a slave of Saboksi who later becomes Jeon Woo-chi's loyal servant.
- Lee Byung-joon as Woon-bo, Lee Hye-ryung's servant/guardian, a quack guru/fortune teller.
- Ahn Yong-joon as Yi Geo, who ascended to the throne at a young age as the result of a coup to dethrone his half-brother the king. He once feigned utter indifference in politics as a mode of self-preservation, and even after becoming king he isn't quite able to command full authority and continues the pretending game: he has three facades he hides behind—weak, lax, and indecisive. In actuality, though, Yi Geo harbors "a grand vision for a new Joseon."
- Hong Jong-hyun as Seo Chan-hwi, a member of the royal guard. He is a humorless, rule-following man of honor, and keeps trying to catch Woo-chi because he's acting outside the law.
- Lee Joo-yeon as Eun-woo, a damo ("female officer") who's a skilled warrior and royal guard.
- Kim Byung-se as Oh Yong
- Lee Jae-yong as So-chil
- Shin Seung-hwan as Dung-gae
- Kim Seung-wook as Jang Sa-doo
- Kim Chi-gook as Noh Joon-ik
- Kim Roi-ha as Mak-gae, who is helping Hye-ryung search for her brother.
- Jang Won-young as Eo Joong-yi
- Park Jae-won/Shi Ho as Mong-sae
- Kim Kwang-kyu as Park Myung-gi
- Jo Jae-yoon as Cheol-gyeon
- Jung Soo-young as Eul-yi, the innkeeper of the inn Hyeryeong and Woon-bo stayed.
- Lee Dae-yeon as Policeman Moon
- Kim Byung-choon as Lee Chae-pal
- Choi Deok-moon as Gye-son
- Park Hae-joon as Dae-geun
- Jo Ha-rang as Gam-nae, a gisaeng who works both sides of the law as an informant.
- Jang Jung-hee as Maeb-ji
- Ko Joo-yeon as Kim sshi/Queen
- Park Joo-young as Oh Kyu, the son of a high-ranking minister who is Lee Chi's new editor.
- Kim Jae-man as Eok Chun
- Kim Sang-hoon as Eop Dong
- Park Gil-soo as Choi Sa-ryung
- Baekho as Jang-won, a warrior ordered to safely escort Kang-rim. (cameo, ep 17)
- Ren as Kang-sul, a messenger who delivered the news of a death in the palace. (cameo, ep 17)
- Jung Jin-young as Jeon Woo-chi's mentor. (cameo, ep 1)

== Awards and nominations ==
Year	Award	Category	Recipient	Result
2012	KBS Drama Awards	Excellence Award, Actor in a Mid-length Drama	Cha Tae-hyun	Nominated
2012	KBS Drama Awards	Excellence Award, Actress in a Mid-length Drama	Uee	Nominated
2012	KBS Drama Awards	Best New Actor	Lee Hee-joon	Won
2012	KBS Drama Awards	Best Supporting Actor	Lee Jae-yong	Nominated
2012	KBS Drama Awards	Best Couple Award	Cha Tae-hyun and Uee	Nominated
2013	Mnet 20's Choice Awards	20's Booming Star - Female	Baek Jin-hee	Nominated

== International broadcast ==
Country	Network(s)/Station(s)	Series premiere	Title
Thailand	Workpoint TV	2015	จอน วู ชิ (Jeon Woo Chi)
Indonesia	RTV	January 22, 2016	Aku Cinta Padamu (Jeon Woo-chi)
