= Chŏn Uch'i chŏn =

Korean novel

Chŏn Uch'i chŏn (Korean: 전우치전; Hanja: 田禹治傳; lit. 'The Tale of Chŏn Uch'i') is a classic Korean novel featuring a historical figure named Chŏn Uch'i, who lived in the mid-Joseon period. Most of the novel consists of Chŏn Uch'i using Taoist magic to do something. It is a novel that adequately combines excitement and seriousness, as it evokes the reader's interest by developing the events in the novel through Taoist magic while also using Taoist magic as a means to express a sense of criticism of reality.

== Authorship ==
Both the author and the time of creation are unknown, but it is assumed that the story was written by a man in the 18th or 19th century.

== Plot ==
Chŏn Uch'i chŏn is largely divided into two versions: Chŏn Uch'i chŏn and Chŏn Unch'i chŏn. The two versions have different plots.

=== Chŏn Uch'i chŏn ===
The following is the plot of the Chŏn Uch'i chŏn version of the novel. Chŏn Chungbo is a slave belonging to the Gangwon Provincial Office in Wonju. He offers tens of thousands of sacks of rice during a famine to help the people of Korea and receives a government post. Afterward, Chŏn Chungbo and his wife dream of a boy who serves Taoist gods, and his wife gives birth to a boy, who they name Uch'i. In his childhood, Uch'i learns Taoist magic from different teachers. One day, upon hearing from a fortuneteller that Uch'i has the mark of a king, Uch'i's father attempts to kill him to protect the family, but Uch'i runs away. Uch'i becomes the leader of thieves and steals rice from Buddhist temples. He also goes to China to ridicule the Ming Emperor and disappear after revealing that he is Korean. When the Ming Emperor sends an emissary to Joseon, demanding that they bring Uch'i to him, the Korean government officials imprison Uch'i's father, Chŏn Chungbo, to catch Uch'i. When Uch'i appears in front of the king, the king promotes Chŏn Chungbo as Uch'i requested and sends Uch'i to China. The Ming Emperor tries to punish him but is duped into giving him a government post, and Uch'i makes fun of the emperor and disappears once again. Afterward, Uch'i heads to the Chinese state of Yan and marries its princess, brings his parents over from Joseon to Yan, and eventually becomes the king of Yan.

=== Chŏn Unch'i chŏn ===
The following is the plot of the Chŏn Unch'i chŏn version of the novel. In the late Goryeo dynasty, there was a scholar named Chŏn Suk, who never held a government office, and his wife surnamed Choe. They dream of a boy who serves Taoist gods and have a son, who they name Unch'i. One day. Unch'i lies with a woman, who is actually a fox (golden nine-tailed fox or Baeg-yeowoo) in disguise, and ends up swallowing a ball of the fox's energy that was in its mouth. It gives him the power to turn into 36 different beings. At the age of 15, he wins first place in the civil examination. The next year, on the way to a temple where a demon is supposed to be tormenting people, he meets an old man, who gives him a rope and a paper talisman. A beautiful woman approaches him at night, and Unch'i figures out that she is an old fox in disguise. He binds her with the rope and subdues her with the talisman. The fox gives him the Heavenly Book, a mysterious and secret book that contains Taoist magic used by Taoist gods, and learns all the magic.

After becoming proficient at Taoist magic, Unch'i gives up his government post and wanders the country using Taoist magic. He makes a fool of the king, helps ordinary people in need, and plays tricks on government officials. As Unch'i kicks up a storm throughout the country, the king gives him a government post to stop him from his mischief. However, when government officials torment him, he decides to punish them. Through this experience, he becomes a new man, devoting himself to the country and subjugating thieves. Around that time, a treasonous plot is uncovered in Hoseo, and Unch'i is arrested when the conspirator confesses that he wished to enthrone Unch'i as a king. Unch'i uses Taoist magic to escape and lives in hiding with his mother in the mountains. Even in hiding, he uses magic to punish a Buddhist monk who harasses a widow, torments a government official who told the king to kill Unch'i, and sets an envious wife straight. When he tries to help a friend, who falls head over heels for a widow, Unch'i is scolded by Gangnim Doryeong, who is a Taoist god. One day, Chŏn Unch'i travels to Sŏ Hwadam, who is known for his Taoist magic skills. He competes with Seo's younger brother and wins but ends up losing to Seo. Afterward, he follows Sŏ into the mountains of gods to cultivate himself and is never seen again.

== Features and significance ==
Since Chŏn Uch'i chŏn consists of two different versions with different plots, it is necessary to examine the features and significance of each version separately. In the big picture, Chŏn Uch'i chŏn was mainly discussed in comparison with Hong Gildong jeon (洪吉童傳 The Tale of Hong Gildong) in terms of the basic form and themes. Regarding the form of the two versions, the Chŏn Uch'i chŏn version is similar to Hong Gildong-jeon as it narrates the life story of a hero, while the Chŏn Unch'i chŏn version consists of independent episodes, unlike Hong Gildong-jeon.

Aside from the fact that the protagonists of both stories are born to a parent who is a slave, and become kings by the end, and that their spaces of activity are expanded from Joseon Korea to overseas, the Chŏn Uch'i chŏn version and Hong Gildong-jeon have other similarities in terms of specific events in the plot. However, while Hong Gildong-jeon expresses a sense of criticism of reality through the protagonist's use of Taoist magic, the Chŏn Uch'i chŏn version shows its protagonist using Taoist magic to fulfill his own desires and needs.

On the other hand, the Chŏn Unch'i chŏn version does not copy the Hong Gildong-jeon in terms of the format. The plot of this version largely consists of three major events: 1) the birth of Chŏn Uch'i and his learning of Taoist magic, 2) his various activities using Taoist magic, and 3) his competition against Sŏ Hwadam and defeat, and his disappearance into the mountains to cultivate himself. The novel mainly consists of 2, which also reveals the theme of the novel. Jeon Uch'i's magical activities tend to be focused on helping the common people (the subjugated) in need or punishing the ruling class who harass the common people. This exposes the negative aspects of reality, and therefore the Chŏn Unch'i chŏn version maintains a critical sense of reality, similar to Hong Gildong-jeon. In this way, Chŏn Uch'i chŏn combined excitement and seriousness by using colorful and fascinating Taoist magic to criticize reality. Chŏn Uch'i chŏn well illustrates the significance of the existence of the so-called "Taoist magic novels," classic Korean novels where the story progresses through the use of Taoist magic.

According to some historical myth, The source of Jeon Woo-chi's magical abilities is said to derive from a fox spirit (kumiho; nine-tailed fox, or baeg-yeowoo; white fox), whose powers he allegedly seized. Jeon Woo-chi and the fox spirit are often depicted as deceiving one another. In fact, Jeon Woo-chi displays many trickster-like qualities reminiscent of a fox, which may explain why he is frequently associated with fox imagery.

== Other ==
In 2009, Chŏn Uch'i chŏn was turned into a film titled Jeon Woo-chi: The Taoist Wizard by director Choi Dong-hoon. Gang Dong-Won starred as the titular character. In 2012, it was also turned into a TV series with 24 episodes under the title Jeon Woo-chi, starring Cha Tae-hyun as the titular character.

== Texts ==
All editions of Chŏn Uch'i chŏn are written in hangeul (Korean alphabet). There are a total of 19 editions, including seven editions of handwritten scripts, three editions of woodblock prints created in Seoul, and nine editions of metal-type prints. The 19 editions are divided into the Chŏn Uch'i chŏn version and the Chŏn Unch'i chŏn version. There are only handwritten scripts of the Chŏn Uch'i chŏn version of the novel, including the one owned by Nason Kim Dong-uk. On the other hand, there are various forms of the Chŏn Unch'i chŏn version of the novel, including handwritten scripts, woodblock prints created in Seoul, and metal-type prints. The fact that woodblock prints of the novel continued to be printed and abridged (from 37 pages to 22 pages and again to 17 pages) shows that this version was well-loved by the readers.

Compared to the copies of the Chŏn Uch'i chŏn version, the editions of the Chŏn Unch'i chŏn version were created at an earlier time. The edition that is representative of this version is a 37-page woodblock print publication created in Seoul. Engraved in Seoul and printed in 1847, it is the oldest edition of Chŏn Uch'i chŏn today. The "Ilsabon" (an edition handwritten by Ilsa Bang Jong-hyeon, currently housed at the Kyujanggak Institute for Korean Studies at Seoul National University) is a handwritten version of the 37-page woodblock print created in Seoul. Of the metal-type prints, "Sinmungwanbon" (an edition printed by a publisher named Sinmungwan) is the oldest edition, published in 1914. This suggests that the Chŏn Unch'i chŏn version is the more representative version of the novel. Despite this, the novel is referred to as Chŏn Uch'i chŏn, possibly because it is based on an actual historical figure, whose name is listed in the records of the Joseon dynasty as "Jeon U-chi."
