= Run It (Stray Kids song) =

Single by Stray Kids

from the EP This & That
- Language: English; Korean
- Released: June 24, 2026
- Studio: JYPE (Seoul); Channie's "Room" (Seoul)
- Genre: Pop; alternative hip-hop; worldbeat
- Length: 3:29
- Label: JYP; Republic
- Composers: Bang Chan; Changbin; Han; Marcus Lomax; Versachoi
- Lyricists: Bang Chan; Changbin; Han; Marcus Lomax

Stray Kids singles chronology
"Stay" (2026)	"Run It" (2026)	"This & That" (2026)

Music video
- "Run It" on YouTube

"Run It" is a song by South Korean boy band Stray Kids from their tenth Korean-language EP, This & That (2026). It was released as the EP's pre-released single on June 24, 2026, through JYP Entertainment and Republic Records.

== Background and release ==
On June 22, 2026, Stray Kids announced the single, titled "Run It", through its teaser video, alongside the band's tenth Korean-language EP, This & That, and its supporting concert tour, Run It World Tour. The song was released through digital music and streaming platforms for the next two days. "Run It" appears as the first track on the EP.

== Composition ==
"Run It" was written by Stray Kids' in-house production team 3Racha and Marcus "MarcLo" Lomax, and co-composed with Versachoi. The song combines pop and alternative hip-hop and incorporates a worldbeat rhythm, based on brass instrument and marching-drum sounds. Its lyrics express "unstoppable progress and the confidence of racing toward victory," their journey from "small room" to "Seoul" and "the world", as well as conveying their gratitude to their fans as their "motivation". The band described the song as their "new anthem".

== Reception ==
Professional ratings
Review scores
Source	Rating
IZM	3/5 stars

Writing for IZM, Kim Ho-hyun gave "Run It" three out of five stars, commenting that "the [song's] mixing, which heavily compresses the overall sound, feels somewhat unsatisfying. While it succeeded in bringing the vocals to the forefront to highlight the melody, the process made the vocal tones somewhat flat, diluting the singers' dimensionality." The critic felt the band emphasized the song's overall energy and the team's cohesion rather than delicate textures and each member's individuality. According to Luminate, the song sold 2,000 digital sales in the United States for two-day tracking.

== Music video ==
An official music video for "Run It", directed by Sam Son, premiered on June 24, 2026, concurrently with the single release. Set in a warehouse and sun-bleached desert, the video shows vanguard-like Stray Kids' "collision and cycles through black and white", expressing "symbolic direction connecting the past and present through a forward-moving force, combined with a refined narrative and black-and-white harmony."

== Live performances ==
Stray Kids debuted the live performance of "Run It" at their Run It World Tour and included the song on the setlist.

== Credits and personnel ==
Personnel

- Stray Kids – lead vocals, background vocals
  - Bang Chan (3Racha) – lyrics, composition, arrangement, instruments, computer programming, recording, digital editing
  - Changbin (3Racha) – lyrics, composition
  - Han (3Racha) – lyrics, composition
- Marcus "MarcLo" Lomax – lyrics, composition
- Versachoi – composition, arrangement, instruments, digital editing
- Lee Sang-yeob – recording
- Lee Kyeong-won – digital editing
- Yoon Won-kwon – mixing
- Kwon Nam-woo – mastering
- Lee Ha-neul – Dolby Atmos mixing and mastering

Locations

- JYPE Studios – recording
- Channie's "Room" – recording, digital editing
- MadMiix – mixing
- 821 Sound Mastering – mastering
- BK Studio – mixing and mastering in Dolby Atmos

== Charts ==
Chart performance for "Run It"
Chart (2026)	Peak position
Ecuador Anglo Airplay (Monitor Latino)	8
Global Excl. US (Billboard)	163
Japan Hot 100 (Billboard)	26
Japan Digital Singles (Oricon)	8
Japan Streaming (Oricon)	42
New Zealand Hot Singles (RMNZ)	15
Russia Streaming (TopHit)	97
Singapore Regional (RIAS)	18
South Korea BGM (Circle)	57
South Korea Download (Circle)	26
UK Singles Sales (OCC)	14
US Digital Song Sales (Billboard)	9

== Release history ==
Release dates and formats for "Run It"
Region	Date	Format	Label	Ref.
Various	June 24, 2026	Digital download; streaming	JYP; Republic	
Italy	August 21, 2026	Radio airplay	EMI	
