= Stay (Stray Kids song) =

Single by Stray Kids

from the album SKZ-Replay 2026 Pt.1
- Language: Korean
- Released: March 25, 2026
- Studio: JYP (Seoul)
- Length: 3:06
- Label: JYP; Republic
- Composers: Seungmin; Han; Millionboy; Younghood
- Lyricists: Seungmin; Han

Stray Kids singles chronology
"Do It" / "Divine" (2025)	"Stay" (2026)	"Run It" (2026)

"Stay" (Korean: 별, 빛; RR: Byeol, bit; lit. 'star, light') is a song by South Korean boy band Stray Kids from their fourth compilation album SKZ-Replay 2026 Pt.1 (2026). It was released as a single through JYP Entertainment and Republic Records on March 25, 2026, to commemorate the group's eighth anniversary since their debut in 2018.

== Background and release ==
On March 20, 2026, Stray Kids announced the single, "Stay". Titled after their fan club of the same name, the song commemorated the group's eighth anniversary since their debut in 2018. Inspired by the group's official lightstick, the single's cover artwork was contributed by Stray Kids' members by designing each member's star. Three days later, the snippet of the song was previewed via short-form video. "Stay" was released through digital music and streaming platforms on March 25. "Stay" was later included on the band's fourth compilation album SKZ-Replay 2026 Pt.1 (2026).

== Composition ==
"Stay" was written by Stray Kids' members Seungmin and Han (3Racha), and co-composed and arranged by Millionboy and Younghood. Musically, the song is a ballad driven by band-styled guitar and piano. As a "gift" to their fans, the song's lyrics express the "hope for tomorrow", metaphorized as the universe and stars, reflecting on the time "walked together with fans" under the same sky and rely on one another, and promising moments in the future.

== Live performances ==
Stray Kids debuted the performance of "Stay" at their sixth fan meeting, Stay in Our Little House, in March and April 2026.

== Credits and personnel ==
Personnel

- Stray Kids – lead vocals
  - Seungmin – background vocals, lyrics, composition, vocal direction
  - Han – background vocals, lyrics, composition, vocal direction
- Millionboy – composition, arrangement, piano, synthesizer, drums, bass, computer programming
- Younghood – composition, arrangement, computer programming
- Nickko Young – guitar
- Kwak Bo-eun – recording
- Louis. K – digital editing, mixing, mixing in Dolby Atmos
- Kwon Nam-woo – mastering

Locations

- JYP Studio – recording
- Ritz Lab Studio – digital editing, mixing, mixing in Dolby Atmos
- 821 Sound Mastering – mastering

== Charts ==
Chart performance for "Stay"
Chart (2026)	Peak position
Japan Digital Singles (Oricon)	16
Japan Download Songs (Billboard Japan)	17
Japan Hot Shot Songs (Billboard Japan)	11
South Korea BGM (Circle)	52
South Korea Download (Circle)	34
US World Digital Song Sales (Billboard)	4

== Release history ==
Release dates and formats for "Stay"
Region	Date	Format	Label	Ref.
Various	March 25, 2026	Digital download; streaming	JYP; Republic	
