= Traditional Korean rhythm =

Rhythmic pattern repeated on a percussion instrument

Korean traditional rhythm, or Jangdan (장단) is a rhythmic pattern repeated with a percussion instrument such as a Janggu or hourglass drum. There is a basic format, but there are many variations while playing the songs. Korean traditional music is usually sung with the Jangdan played by the Janggu. This accompaniment is called 'hitting the Jangdan'. But in music mainly composed for percussion instruments like Korean traditional folk music, it is called 'hitting the steel' or 'hitting the Pungmul (풍물)'. Jangdan can be categorized into two groups: Jeong-Ak (formal music) Jangdan and Min-Sok-Ak (traditional folk music) Jangdan.

== How to read Jangdan ==
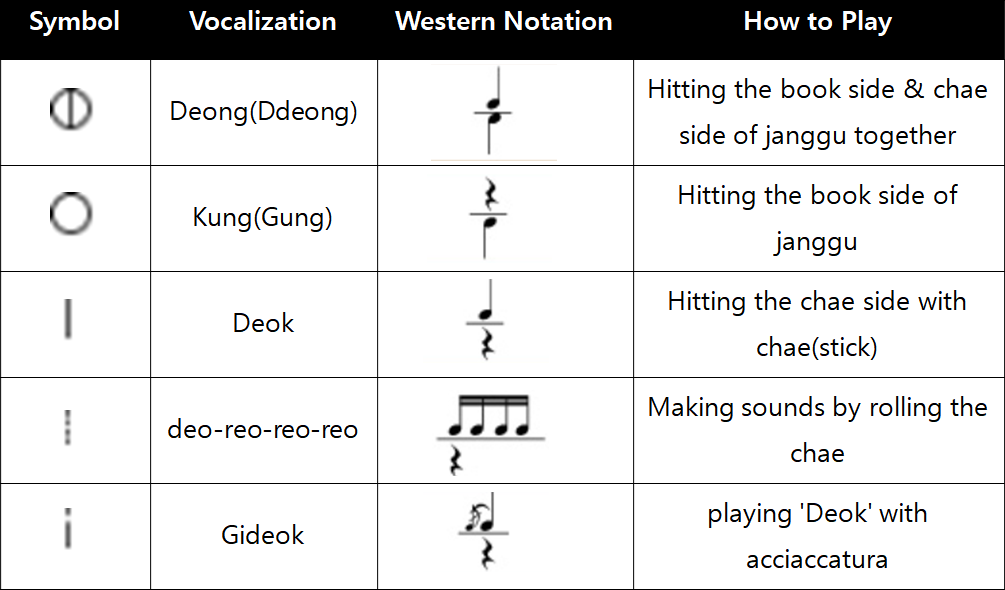
A table of how to read Akbo

Jangdan are represented visually via rhythmic scores referred to as "Akbo" or "Karakbo". Most Karakbo are geared towards representing the beats the janggu plays. Janggu have two distinct drum sticks, the yeolchae and gungchae. The yeolchae is played on the higher-pitched drum head whereas the gungchae is played on the lower-pitched drum head. Which side the yeolchae is played depends on the preference of the player, but the dominant hand is used.

When playing janggu as an accompaniment to Pansori, usually only the yeolchae is used (the hand that plays the gungchae is kept empty and may tap or mute the lower-pitched drum head instead). and nothing on the left. However, while playing outdoor music such as P'ungmul or SamulNori, people use the gung chae with their left (non dominant) hand. Also, it is general to hit the middle of the drum head, but exceptionally, a corner of the drum head with a small volume is used while playing solo or indoor music.

== Jeong-Ak (Formal music) Jangdan ==
Jangdan, used in Jeong-Ak, is usually played by Janggu. It is often used in Jangdan in Young-San-Hoe-Sang(靈山會相). Also, Jangdan's music for national ceremonies is an example. There are many combinations of rhythms in slow Jeong-Ak Jangdan, many Doduri in normal speed Jangdan, and many Ta-ryoung in fast Jangdan.

=== Sang-Young-San Jangdan ===
Sang-Young-San Jangdan has a very slow 10-beat tempo. If one beat is considered a half note, the Jangdan is a 10/2 beat tempo, and if considered a quarter note, the Jangdan is a 10/8+8+8 beat tempo. Sometimes it is considered a 20-beat tempo for very slow music. The Sang-Young-San Jangdan is used in the first and middle part of the Young-San-Hoe-Sang(靈山會相), 1~3 chapter of Yeo-Min-Rak(與民樂), 1~4 chapter of Bo-Heo-Sa/Bo-Heo-Ja(步虛子).

=== Se-Ryoung-San Jangdan ===
Se-Ryoung-San Jangdan is a 10-beat tempo, similar to Sang-Young-San Jangdan but a bit faster, so it has many variations. It is used in Se-Young-San in Young-San-Hoe-Sang, Ga-Rak-Deo-Ri, 4~7 chapter of Yeo-Min-Rak, and 5~7 chapters of Bo-Heo-Sa/Bo-Heo-Ja(步虛子).

=== Doduri Jangdan ===
Doduri Jangdan is the most used Jangdan in Jeong-Ak (formal music), with a 6-beat tempo in normal speed. It has many variations that depend on the song.

=== Chee-Ta Jangdan ===
Chee-Ta Jangdan is used in marching music. It is a 12-beat tempo.

=== Ga-Gok (songs with singing/lyrics) Jangdan ===
In most Ga-Gok, the Jangdan mostly has a 16-beat tempo.

=== Extra Jangdan ===
- Ga-sa Jangdan
- Si-jo Jangdan

== Min-Sok-Ak (traditional folk music) Jangdan ==
There are many categories in traditional folk music. Pansori Jangdan is played by a drum; the Jangdan of Ip-Chang is played by Sogo (mini drum). The Jangdan of all traditional instrumental music is played by Jang-gu.

=== Gutgeori (굿거리) ===
Gutgeori jang dan is the 12 beats jang dan most played in folk music with Semati jang dan. Gutgeori Ja Dan's basic rhythm is ‘(덩기덕 쿵 더러러러 쿵기덕 쿵 더러러러)’. It's played in various cases, like pansori, sanjo, muak, and dancing music. For example, gutgeori is played in folk music like Nuilliliya, Hangangsu-talyeoung, and Pungnyeon-ga. It's played in Gut in Seoul, Gyeonggi, Jeolla. In this case, it is usually made up with piri, haegum, and janggu in Seoul or Gyeonggi, and we add jing at Jeolla's Gut.

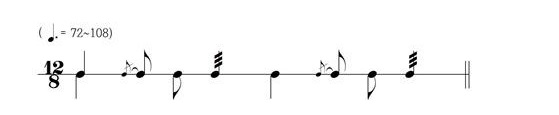
Sheet music of Gutgeori Jangdan

=== Dodeuri (도드리) ===
Dodeuri jangdan is played in various kinds of music, and it's changed its rhythm for purposes. Music by Dodeuri Jangdan gives us grave and strong feelings. Dodeuri of eight-eighteen times or six-four times is used in Yeongsan-Hoesang, and Dodeuri of six-two times used in pansori like Chunmyeongog or Jugjisa. Otherwise, Dodeuri Jangdan is played for court dance as Cheoyongmu, Pogulag and Samhyeon Dodeuri which is made up of Samhyeon-Yuggag.

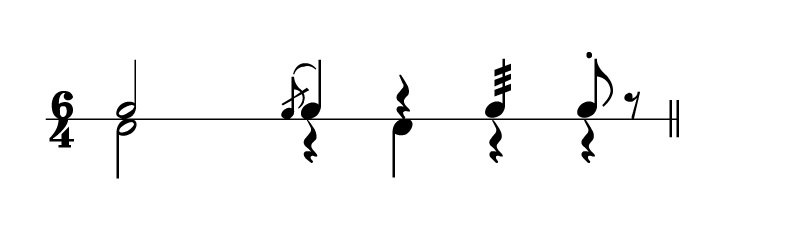
Sheet music of Doduri Jangdan

=== Semachi (세마치) ===
‘Semachi’ means ‘finish at the third turn’, namely play three times. Its basic rhythm is (덩덩덕쿵덕). Semachi jangdan is a bit fast; three beats jangdan. It is divided it one time into three beats so we could play the nine-eight-times jangdan. Music with Semachi Jangdan gives us cheerful and valiant feelings. Semachi Jangdan is one of the jangdan played in pansori and nongak. For example, it is played in Yangsando, Ginbanga-Talyeong, Jindo-Arirang, and Bellflower-Talyeong.·

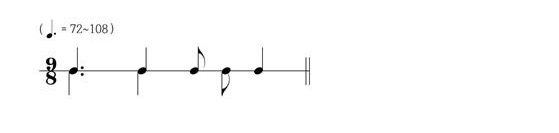
Sheet music of Semachi Jangdan

=== Eotmori (엇모리) ===
‘Eotmori’ means Jangdan which go forward in rotation. Its basic rhythm is (더엉궁 따악 구웅 궁 따악). Eotmori Jangdan is very fast–ten-eight times jangdan. Unusually, it is composed with a 3-beat and 2-beat rotation instead of the same rhythm's repetition. Eotmori Jangdan is played in pansori and sanjo. There are late Eotmori and frequent Eotmori Jangdan which have different speeds. Pansori is usually made up of late Urmorie and frequent Eotmori Jangdan. Sanjo is usually made up of late Eotmori Jangdan.

Sheet music of Eotmori Jangdan

=== Jajinmori (자진모리) ===
‘Jajinmori’ means ‘Frequently’ Jangdan. Its basic rhythm is (덩 쿵 쿵덕쿵). Jajinmori Jangdan is fast eight-twelve times Jangdan which is played in pansori or sanjo. It can be played with its three beats together at one time, and in this case, one jangdan is the same as four times. Music with Jajinmori jangdan gives us active and enchanting feelings. Jajinmori jangdan is usually played in pansori, sanjo, nongak, and muga, especially in dramatic and urgent parts. We could see Jajinmori jangdan in Chunhyang-ga, Simcheong-ga, Heungbu-ga, and Jeokbyeok-ga.

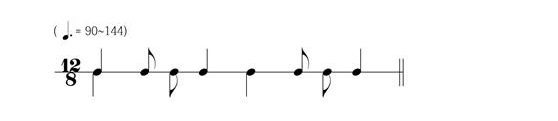
Sheet music of Jajinmori Jangdan

=== Jungmori (중모리) ===
This is one of the Jangdan in Korean traditional music. This Jangdan is composed of 12 tempos and is usually used in pansori sanjo and minyo, the Korean traditional folk songs. These tempos are averaged at 12 tempos, and 1 tempo is expressed as a quarter note, so the total tempo of the 12/4 beat. In Pansori, this jangdan is used in the descriptive or emotional parts. Famous usage of this jangdan is <Chunhyangga>'s SSukdaemuri and <Heungboga>'s Ganantaryeong.

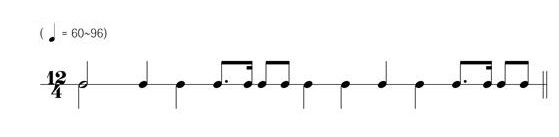
Sheet music of Jungmori Jangdan

=== Jungjungmori (중중모리) ===
Jungjungmori is usually used in part because it is very fun and exciting, but sometimes it is used in part because it expresses struggling and wailing. The most famous part that uses Jungjungmori is <Chunhyangga>’s gisanyeongsu.

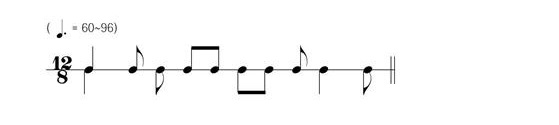
Sheet music of Jungjungmori Jangdan

=== Jinyangjo (진양조) ===
This jangdan is the slowest jangdan used in Pansori or Sanjo. 6 beats compose one gak, and four gaks compose 1 jangdan, so 1 jangdan is composed of 24 beats. At pushing sound, we use the first gak for hanging sound, the third gak for binding sound, and the last gak for unwinding sound. The number of gaks depends on the binding and unwinding of sounds. This jangdan is usually used in lyrical, leisurely, majestic, fluffy, or crying lyrical parts.

Sheet music of Jinyangjo Jangdan

=== Hwimori (휘모리) ===
By its name, ‘Hwimori(휘모리)’ we can notice that this jangdan is as fast as a whirlwind. At the first beat, we make ‘deong’, and at the late third beat, we hit strong with chae. This jangdan is written as 4/4 or 12/8 beats. This is the fastest jangdan used in Pansori or Sanjo and is usually used in a situation that is very busy. The most famous part that uses this jangdan is the end of <Choonhyangga>’s sinyunmadji.

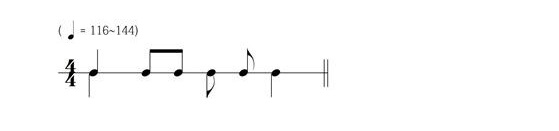
Hwimorie

=== Utjungmori (엇중모리) ===
This jangdan is used in Pansori and is composed of 6 beats, and the speed is average. It is used at the end of the part where the boss tells the story or at the end of the pansori. The most famous part that uses this jangdan is <Choonhyangga>’s By Hoedongsungchampan Younggam.
