= Do It (Stray Kids song) =

- Remixes cover

Single by Stray Kids

from the EP Do It
- Language: Korean; English
- A-side: "Divine"
- Released: November 21, 2025
- Studio: JYP (Seoul)
- Genre: Reggaeton
- Length: 2:39
- Label: JYP; Republic
- Composers: Bang Chan; Changbin; Han; JBach; Marc Sibley; Nathan Cunningham
- Lyricists: Bang Chan; Changbin; Han; JBach

Stray Kids singles chronology
"In the Dark" (2025)	"Do It" / "Divine" (2025)	"Stay" (2026)

Music video
- "Do It" on YouTube "Do It" (Overdrive remix) on YouTube

"Do It" is a song by South Korean boy band Stray Kids from their second mixtape of the same name. It was released through JYP Entertainment and Republic Records on November 21, 2025, as the mixtape's lead single, alongside "Divine".

== Background and release ==
Stray Kids announced their second mixtape, marketed as "SKZ It Tape", titled Do It on October 19, 2025, at the group's Dominate: Celebrate encore shows of the Dominate World Tour. They played the black-and-white trailer on screen, featuring the members as present-day divines (seonin), and later uploaded it to their social media. The next day, the group posted the mixtape's track list, confirming "Do It" and "Divine" as the dual lead singles. "Do It" was teased through a house-based mashup video, and its instrumentals via the group's social media. JYP Entertainment and Republic Records released "Do It" concurrently with the mixtape on November 21, 2025. The remix EP was released three days after.

== Production and composition ==
Stray Kids' in-house production team 3Racha, consisting of Bang Chan, Changbin, and Han, wrote "Do It" with JBach and Space Primates in a three-day song camp, alongside other six songs—"Chk Chk Boom", "I Like It", and "Stray Kids" from Ate (2024); "U" (featuring Tablo) from Hop (2024); and "Phoenix" from Karma (2025). Musically, "Do It" is a reggaeton-based track with a "relaxed and cool attitude", "addictive" riff, and funky bassline conveying the message "don't hesitate, trust your instincts, and move forward." The trio described the song as a "more mature", "sexier", and "more refined" song than their own Latin-influenced track "Chk Chk Boom".

== Music video ==
Jihoon Shin directed the music video for "Do It". It premiered on November 21, 2025, in conjunction with the release of the mixtape, preceded by a teaser video. Opening with dystopian Seoul with cracking thunder and ominous crows over ruined buildings overgrown with plants, the grayscale visuals show each member of all-black Stray Kids as a modern-day seonin with a cowboy hat appearing on the frame among a group of statue-like frozen figures dressed in white robes around the room. During the first chorus, it switches from grayscale to Technicolor, expressing the group and the white figures as dancers performing choreography together. During the bridge, the video depicts a glimpse of a giant fireball glowing inside the building, which Billboard called it "Harry Potter-like magic", and pink confetti rains on the group in the final chorus.

The "Overdrive version" music video was released on November 24, alongside the remix EP, featuring Stray Kids enjoying a private party at a luxurious resort.

== Live performances ==
Stray Kids promoted and performed "Do It" on the music programs Music Bank, Show! Music Core, and Inkigayo from November 21 to 23.

== Publication lists ==
Critics' rankings of "Do It"
Critic/Publication	Accolade	Rank	Ref.
The Hollywood Reporter	The 40 Best K-pop Songs of 2025	33	
Rolling Stone India	The 25 Best K-pop Songs of 2025	—N/a	

== Accolades ==
List of awards and nominations received by "Do It"
Ceremony	Year	Category	Result	Ref.
TMELive International Music Awards	2026	Global Trend Songs Top 10	Won	

Music program awards for "Do It"
Program	Date	Ref.
Show Champion	November 26, 2025	
Show Champion	December 3, 2025	

== Track listing ==
- Digital download and streaming – remixes
1. "Do It" – 2:39
2. "Do It" (Overdrive version; with Moonshine) – 2:37
3. "Do It" (Turbo version; with Omega) – 2:30
4. "Do It" (sped up) – 2:11
5. "Do It" (slowed down) – 2:52
6. "Do It" (instrumental) – 2:39

== Credits and personnel ==
Personnel

- Stray Kids – lead vocals
  - Bang Chan (3Racha) – background vocals, lyrics, composition, instruments, vocal direction
  - Changbin (3Racha) – background vocals, lyrics, composition, vocal direction
  - Han (3Racha) – background vocals, lyrics, composition, vocal direction
- JBach – lyrics, composition
- Space Primates (Marc Sibley and Nathan Cunningham) – composition, arrangement, piano, computer programming
- Kwak Bo-eun – recording
- Lee Chang-hoon – recording
- Eom Se-hee – recording
- Louis. K – digital editing
- Josh Gudwin – mixing
  - Felix Byrne – assistant
- Kwon Nam-woo – mastering
- Lee Ha-neul – mixing and mastering in Dolby Atmos

Locations

- JYP Studios – recording
- Ritz Lab Studio – digital editing
- Gudwin Sound Studios – mixing
- 821 Sound Mastering – mastering
- BK Studio – mixing and mastering in Dolby Atmos

== Charts ==
=== Weekly charts ===
Weekly chart performance for "Do It"
Chart (2025–2026)	Peak position
Austria (Ö3 Austria Top 40)	56
Canada Hot 100 (Billboard)	56
Czech Republic Singles Digital (ČNS IFPI)	46
Germany (GfK)	42
Germany Dance (GfK)	3
Global 200 (Billboard)	13
Greece International (IFPI)	28
Guatemala Anglo Airplay (Monitor Latino)	9
Hong Kong (Billboard)	24
Ireland (IRMA)	87
Japan Hot 100 (Billboard)	33
Japan Combined Singles (Oricon)	27
Lithuania (AGATA)	57
Malaysia International (RIM)	20
Netherlands (Global Top 40)	27
Netherlands (Single Top 100)	49
New Zealand Hot Singles (RMNZ)	9
Peru Airplay (Monitor Latino)	16
Poland (Polish Streaming Top 100)	56
Portugal (AFP)	93
Russia Streaming (TopHit)	75
Singapore (RIAS)	16
Slovakia Singles Digital (ČNS IFPI)	52
South Korea (Circle)	46
South Korea (Korea Hot 100)	58
Sweden Heatseeker (Sverigetopplistan)	2
Switzerland (Schweizer Hitparade)	71
Taiwan (Billboard)	11
UK Singles (Official Charts)	35
UK Indie (Official Charts)	8
US Billboard Hot 100	68
US World Digital Song Sales (Billboard)	1

=== Monthly charts ===
Monthly chart performance for "Do It"
Chart (2025)	Position
Russia Streaming (TopHit)	83
South Korea (Circle)	109

=== Year-end charts ===
Year-end chart performance for "Do It"
Chart (2025)	Position
South Korea Download (Circle)	55

== Release history ==
Release dates and formats
Region	Date	Format	Version	Label	Ref.
Various	November 21, 2025	Digital download; streaming	Original; Festival	JYP; Republic	
Various	November 23, 2025	Digital download	Original; Overdrive; Turbo; sped up; slowed down; instrumental	JYP; Republic	
Various	November 24, 2025	Digital download; streaming	Remixes	JYP; Republic	

== See also ==
- List of Show Champion Chart winners (2025)
