= Chŏn Uch'i =

Korean Taoist scholar (fl. 15th–16th centuries)

- Hangul: 전우치
- Hanja: 田禹治
- RR: Jeon Uchi
- MR: Chŏn Uch'i

Art name
- Hangul: 우사
- Hanja: 羽士
- RR: Usa
- MR: Usa

Chŏn Uch'i (Korean: 전우치; Hanja: 田禹治; fl. 15th and 16th centuries) was a Taoist scholar during the Joseon dynasty of Korea. He is known by many as the most prominent "historical Taoist sorcerer" in Korean history, and a representative trickster from old Korean literature. His art name was Usa (우사; 羽士), which means "featherman". Though he was a Taoist heretic, he studied Confucianism under Sŏ Kyŏngdŏk.

== Stories about his historical centurys and legend life ==
According to the Complete Works from Azure Residence by Yi Deok-moo, when Chŏn was very young, he went to a mountain temple to study in solitude. One day, the rice wine which was brewed at the temple vanished. The monks scolded Chŏn, accusing him of drinking it. Chŏn was aggrieved and upset, so he decided to hunt down the true culprit. He waited beside the wine jugs until twilight. At dusk, a nine-tailed fox came out from the forest and drank the wine until she was drunk. Chŏn jumped out and tied her up with some rope. The fox offered him her grimoire if he would release her. Chŏn accepted that and became a sorcerer through studying the fox's grimoire.

In another version of the story from one the Ilsamungo-version of the Chŏn Uch'i chŏn, young Chŏn and a fox (who was shaped like a woman) loved each other. One day while they kissed each other, the fox's magical marble went into Chŏn's mouth, and he swallowed it. Then she, abashed, ran away and he absorbed the marble's power, becoming a sorcerer.

According to the Unofficial History of the East Land, one day between 1522 and 1566, Yi Kil's farm (which is in today's Bupyeong District) was suffering from an epidemic, and Yi's serfs and neighbors were ill in bed. Then Chŏn visited Yi and expelled a disease.

== Death ==
As he was Taoist heretic, if not anarchistic, there are some legends that Chŏn opposed the Joseon dynastic government and the king. By one account, he ended up with being arrested and put to death by execution. Some time later, Ch'a Sik, who was Chŏn's alumnus under Sŏ Kyŏngdŏk, was visited by Chŏn. Chŏn borrowed Cha Anthology of Du Fu and went away. Cha had known nothing about Chŏn's death, so he talked about this to other alumni. Surprised, they dig up Chŏn's tomb and opened the coffin to find there was no body.

== Popular culture ==
- Portrayed by Kang Dong-won in the 2009 film Jeon Woo-chi: The Taoist Wizard.
- Portrayed by Cha Tae-hyun in the 2012–2013 KBS2 TV series Jeon Woo-chi.
- Portrayed by Lee Se-chang in the 2016 MBC TV series The Flower in Prison.
