= List of number-one hits of 2025 (Germany) =

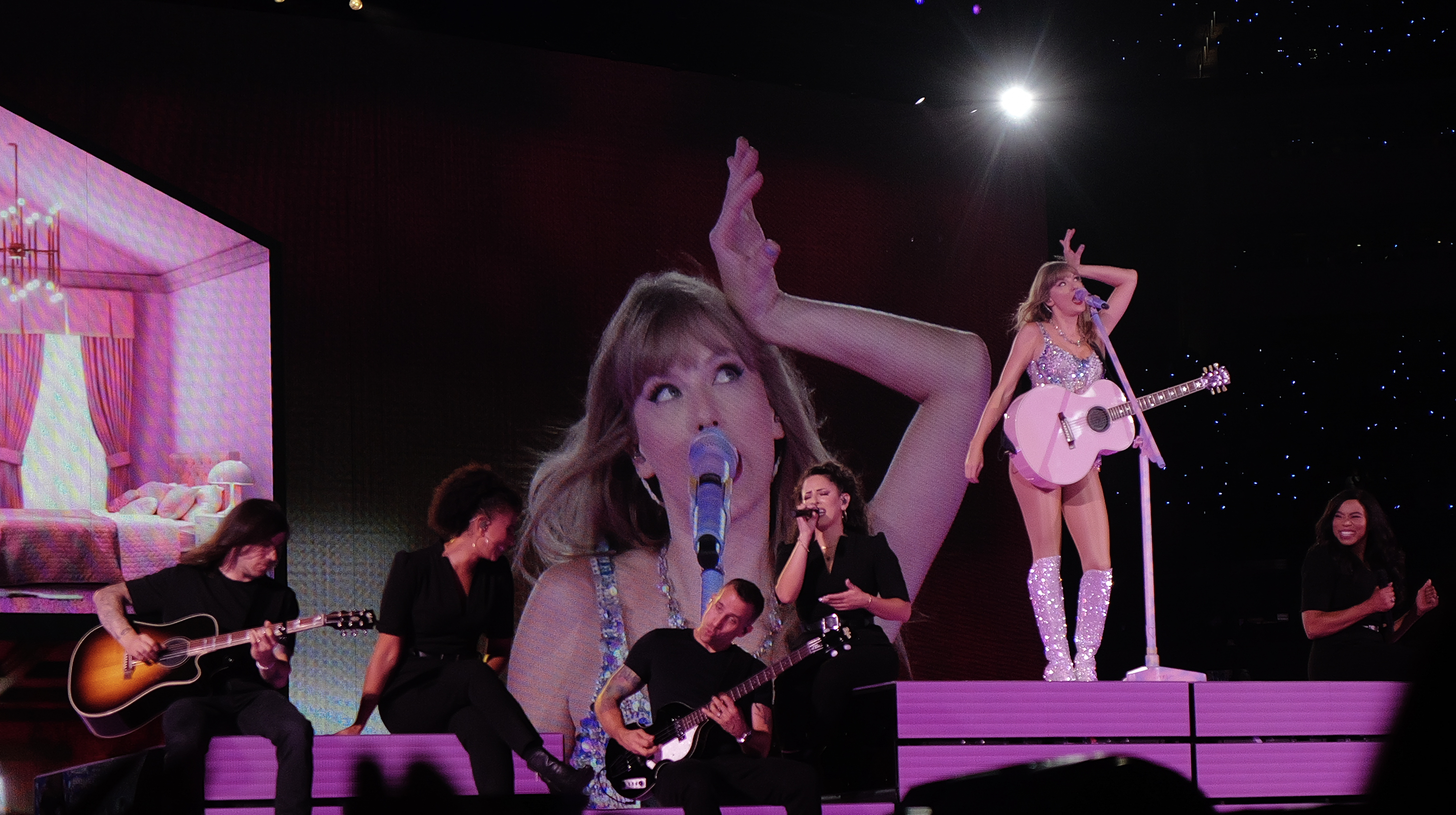
Oimara's "Wackelkontakt" became the best-performing single of 2025, while Taylor Swift's (pictured) The Life of a Showgirl became the best-performing album of the year.

The GfK Entertainment charts are record charts compiled by GfK Entertainment on behalf of the German record industry. They include the "Single Top 100" and the "Album Top 100" chart. The chart week runs from Friday to Thursday, and the chart compilations are published on Tuesday for the record industry. The entire top 100 singles and top 100 albums are officially released the following Friday by GfK Entertainment. The charts are based on weekly physical and digital sales and streams of singles and albums, as well as the amount of airplay the songs receive on German radio stations.

== Number-one hits by week ==
Key
†	Indicates best-performing single and album of 2025

Issue date	Song	Artist	Ref.	Album	Artist	Ref.
3 January	"APT."	Rosé and Bruno Mars		Nochmal!	Thomas Anders and Florian Silbereisen	
10 January	"APT."	Rosé and Bruno Mars		From Zero	Linkin Park	
17 January	"APT."	Rosé and Bruno Mars		Tod	Fynn Kliemann	
24 January	"APT."	Rosé and Bruno Mars		Alles Isi	Isi Glück	
31 January	"APT."	Rosé and Bruno Mars		Can't Rush Greatness	Central Cee	
7 February	"Tau mich auf"	Zartmann		Hurry Up Tomorrow	The Weeknd	
14 February	"Wackelkontakt"†	Oimara		Schluss mit lustig	Finch	
21 February	"Wackelkontakt"†	Oimara		Schlau aber blond	Shirin David	
28 February	"Wackelkontakt"†	Oimara		Pazifik	Provinz	
7 March	"Wackelkontakt"†	Oimara		Here Be Dragons	Avantasia	
14 March	"Wackelkontakt"†	Oimara		Mayhem	Lady Gaga	
21 March	"Wackelkontakt"†	Oimara		The Overview	Steven Wilson	
28 March	"Wackelkontakt"†	Oimara		Willkommen im Wunderland	Fantasy	
4 April	"Tau mich auf"	Zartmann		To Be Honest	O'Bros	
11 April	"Akon"	Jazeek		Schönhauser	Zartmann	
18 April	"Akon"	Jazeek		Most Valuable Playa	Jazeek	
25 April	"Akon"	Jazeek		Most Valuable Playa	Jazeek	
2 May	"Akon"	Jazeek		Skeletá	Ghost	
9 May	"Shabab(e)s im VIP"	Pashanim featuring Ceren		Pink Floyd at Pompeii – MCMLXXII	Pink Floyd	
16 May	"Shabab(e)s im VIP"	Pashanim featuring Ceren		Even in Arcadia	Sleep Token	
23 May	"Shabab(e)s im VIP"	Pashanim featuring Ceren		From Zero	Linkin Park	
30 May	"Shabab(e)s im VIP"	Pashanim featuring Ceren		Freigeistin	Sarah Connor	
6 June	"Ordinary"	Alex Warren		Wir kommen in Frieden	Feine Sahne Fischfilet	
13 June	"Ordinary"	Alex Warren		God of Angels Trust	Volbeat	
20 June	"Ordinary"	Alex Warren		Traence	Souly	
27 June	"Ordinary"	Alex Warren		Andrea Berg	Andrea Berg	
4 July	"Ordinary"	Alex Warren		Tracks II: The Lost Albums	Bruce Springsteen	
11 July	"Ordinary"	Alex Warren		KPop Demon Hunters	Various artists	
18 July	"Ordinary"	Alex Warren		KPop Demon Hunters	Various artists	
25 July	"Ordinary"	Alex Warren		Lebe jetzt	Amigos	
1 August	"30 mal am Tag"	Aymen & Sira		Scherbenhaus	Gzuz	
8 August	"Golden"	Huntrix		This Is Not A Drill - Live From Prague	Roger Waters	
15 August	"Golden"	Huntrix		Born Spinner	Reezy	
22 August	"Golden"	Huntrix		Darkness	Mono Inc.	
29 August	"Golden"	Huntrix		Karma	Stray Kids	
5 September	"Golden"	Huntrix		Man's Best Friend	Sabrina Carpenter	
12 September	"Golden"	Huntrix		Forever	RAF Camora	
19 September	"Golden"	Huntrix		Play	Ed Sheeran	
26 September	"Golden"	Huntrix		Ich lieb mich, ich lieb mich nicht	Nina Chuba	
3 October	"Golden"	Huntrix		Orange	01099	
10 October	"The Fate of Ophelia"	Taylor Swift		The Life of a Showgirl†	Taylor Swift	
17 October	"The Fate of Ophelia"	Taylor Swift		Augen träumen Herzen sehen	Kontra K	
24 October	"The Fate of Ophelia"	Taylor Swift		Alles oder nix	SSIO	
31 October	"The Fate of Ophelia"	Taylor Swift		Da braut sich was zusammen	Santiano	
7 November	"The Fate of Ophelia"	Taylor Swift		Traces	Michael Patrick Kelly	
14 November	"The Fate of Ophelia"	Taylor Swift		Immer unter Feuer	Frei.Wild	
21 November	"The Fate of Ophelia"	Taylor Swift		6.0	Ina Müller	
28 November	"The Fate of Ophelia"	Taylor Swift		Dämmerland 2	Dämmerland	
5 December	"All I Want for Christmas Is You"	Mariah Carey		Sterben in Karl-Marx-Stadt	Kraftklub	
12 December	"Last Christmas"	Wham!		Memento Mori: Mexico City	Depeche Mode	
19 December	"Last Christmas"	Wham!		Wish You Were Here	Pink Floyd	
26 December	"Last Christmas"	Wham!		Christmas	Michael Bublé	
