= List of number-one hits of 2025 (Austria) =

This is a list of the Austrian number-one singles and albums of 2025 as compiled by Ö3 Austria Top 40, the official chart provider of Austria.

Issue date	Song	Artist	Ref.	Album	Artist	Ref.
7 January	"Apt."	Rosé and Bruno Mars		From Zero	Linkin Park	
14 January	"Apt."	Rosé and Bruno Mars		From Zero	Linkin Park	
21 January	"Apt."	Rosé and Bruno Mars		Alpenbarbie	Melissa Naschenweng	
28 January	"Apt."	Rosé and Bruno Mars		Neujahrskonzert 2025 – New Year's Concert	Wiener Philharmoniker and Riccardo Muti	
4 February	"Apt."	Rosé and Bruno Mars		Can't Rush Greatness	Central Cee	
11 February	"Wackelkontakt"	Oimara		Wimpernschlag	Rainhard Fendrich	
18 February	"Wackelkontakt"	Oimara		Marathon	Roland Kaiser	
25 February	"Wackelkontakt"	Oimara		Wimpernschlag	Rainhard Fendrich	
4 March	"Wackelkontakt"	Oimara		So Close to What	Tate McRae	
11 March	"Wackelkontakt"	Oimara		Here Be Dragons	Avantasia	
18 March	"Wackelkontakt"	Oimara		Mayhem	Lady Gaga	
25 March	"Wackelkontakt"	Oimara		Music	Playboi Carti	
28 March	"Wackelkontakt"	Oimara		Willkommen im Wunderland	Fantasy	
4 April	"Wackelkontakt"	Oimara		Blood Dynasty	Arch Enemy	
11 April	"Wackelkontakt"	Oimara		Schönhauser	Zartmann	
18 April	"Unsicher"	Nina Chuba		Legende	Edmund	
25 April	"Ordinary"	Alex Warren		From Zero	Linkin Park	
2 May	"Ordinary"	Alex Warren		Skeletá	Ghost	
9 May	"Shabab(e)s im VIP"	Pashanim and Ceren		Pink Floyd at Pompeii – MCMLXXII	Pink Floyd	
16 May	"Shabab(e)s im VIP"	Pashanim and Ceren		Even in Arcadia	Sleep Token	
23 May	"Wasted Love"	JJ		From Zero	Linkin Park	
30 May	"Wasted Love"	JJ		Freigeistin	Sarah Connor	
6 June	"Ordinary"	Alex Warren		Something Beautiful	Miley Cyrus	
13 June	"Ordinary"	Alex Warren		God of Angels Trust	Volbeat	
20 June	"Ordinary"	Alex Warren		Hödn	Seiler und Speer	
27 June	"Ordinary"	Alex Warren		Andrea Berg	Andrea Berg	
4 July	"Ordinary"	Alex Warren		Virgin	Lorde	
11 July	"Jupiter"	RAF Camora and Apache 207		Insieme	Pupo	
18 July	"Ordinary"	Alex Warren		Swag	Justin Bieber	
25 July	"Ordinary"	Alex Warren		Lebe jetzt	Die Amigos	
1 August	"Ordinary"	Alex Warren		Scherbenhaus	Gzuz	
8 August	"Ordinary"	Alex Warren		KPop Demon Hunters	Various artists	
15 August	"Ordinary"	Alex Warren		KPop Demon Hunters	Various artists	
22 August	"Golden"	Huntrix		KPop Demon Hunters	Various artists	
29 August	"Golden"	Huntrix		Karma	Stray Kids	
5 September	"Golden"	Huntrix		Man's Best Friend	Sabrina Carpenter	
12 September	"Golden"	Huntrix		Forever	RAF Camora	
19 September	"Golden"	Huntrix		Play	Ed Sheeran	
26 September	"Golden"	Huntrix		Ich lieb mich, ich lieb mich nicht	Nina Chuba	
3 October	"Golden"	Huntrix		Orange	01099	
10 October	"The Fate of Ophelia"	Taylor Swift		The Life of a Showgirl	Taylor Swift	
17 October	"The Fate of Ophelia"	Taylor Swift		The Life of a Showgirl	Taylor Swift	
24 October	"The Fate of Ophelia"	Taylor Swift		The Life of a Showgirl	Taylor Swift	
31 October	"The Fate of Ophelia"	Taylor Swift		Falco 3	Falco	
7 November	"The Fate of Ophelia"	Taylor Swift		Everybody Scream	Florence and the Machine	
14 November	"The Fate of Ophelia"	Taylor Swift		Lux	Rosalía	
21 November	"The Fate of Ophelia"	Taylor Swift		Everyone's a Star!	5 Seconds of Summer	
28 November	"All I Want for Christmas Is You"	Mariah Carey		Do It	Stray Kids	
5 December	"All I Want for Christmas Is You"	Mariah Carey		Sterben in Karl-Marx-Stadt	Kraftklub	
12 December	"Last Christmas"	Wham!		Memento Mori: Mexico City	Depeche Mode	
19 December	No charts released					
26 December	"Last Christmas"	Wham!		Christmas	Michael Bublé	
