= List of number-one hits of 2025 (Switzerland) =

This is a list of the Swiss Hitparade number-one hits of 2025.

== Swiss charts ==
Issue date	Song	Artist	Album	Artist
5 January	"APT."	Rosé and Bruno Mars	From Zero	Linkin Park
12 January	"APT."	Rosé and Bruno Mars	Debí Tirar Más Fotos	Bad Bunny
19 January	"APT."	Rosé and Bruno Mars	Debí Tirar Más Fotos	Bad Bunny
26 January	"DTMF"	Bad Bunny	Twisted Hearts Club	Pegasus
2 February	"DTMF"	Bad Bunny	Can't Rush Greatness	Central Cee
9 February	"APT."	Rosé and Bruno Mars	Tag & Nacht	Patent Ochsner
16 February	"APT."	Rosé and Bruno Mars	Tag & Nacht	Patent Ochsner
23 February	"APT."	Rosé and Bruno Mars	Tag & Nacht	Patent Ochsner
2 March	"APT."	Rosé and Bruno Mars	So Close to What	Tate McRae
9 March	"Wackelkontakt"	Oimara	Debí Tirar Más Fotos	Bad Bunny
16 March	"APT."	Rosé and Bruno Mars	Mayhem	Lady Gaga
23 March	"Anxiety"	Doechii	Music	Playboi Carti
30 March	"Ordinary"	Alex Warren	Stereo Crush	Gotthard
6 April	"Ordinary"	Alex Warren	Most Valuable Playa	Jazeek
13 April	"Ordinary"	Alex Warren	Who Believes in Angels?	Brandi Carlile and Elton John
20 April	"Ordinary"	Alex Warren	Diamant Noir	Werenoi
27 April	"Ordinary"	Alex Warren	Debí Tirar Más Fotos	Bad Bunny
4 May	"Ordinary"	Alex Warren	Skeletá	Ghost
11 May	"Ordinary"	Alex Warren	Pink Floyd at Pompeii – MCMLXXII	Pink Floyd
18 May	"Ordinary"	Alex Warren	Debí Tirar Más Fotos	Bad Bunny
25 May	"Ordinary"	Alex Warren	Debí Tirar Más Fotos	Bad Bunny
1 June	"Ordinary"	Alex Warren	Debí Tirar Más Fotos	Bad Bunny
8 June	"Ordinary"	Alex Warren	Sturm	Gölä
15 June	"Ordinary"	Alex Warren	God of Angels Trust	Volbeat
22 June	"Ordinary"	Alex Warren	Appear Disappear	The Young Gods
29 June	"Ordinary"	Alex Warren	Mania	Hamza
6 July	"Ordinary"	Alex Warren	Elektrisch	Megawatt
13 July	"Ordinary"	Alex Warren	Load	Marc Amacher
20 July	"Ordinary"	Alex Warren	Swag	Justin Bieber
27 July	"Ordinary"	Alex Warren	Don't Tap the Glass	Tyler, the Creator
3 August	"Ordinary"	Alex Warren	KPop Demon Hunters	Various artists
10 August	"Ordinary"	Alex Warren	KPop Demon Hunters	Various artists
17 August	"Ordinary"	Alex Warren	Born Spinner	Reezy
24 August	"Ordinary"	Alex Warren	KPop Demon Hunters	Various artists
31 August	"Ordinary"	Alex Warren	Heubode	Trauffer
7 September	"Ordinary"	Alex Warren	Man's Best Friend	Sabrina Carpenter
14 September	"Ordinary"	Alex Warren	Forever	RAF Camora
21 September	"Golden"	Huntrix	Play	Ed Sheeran
28 September	"Golden"	Huntrix	Vo de Bärge här	Heimweh
5 October	"Golden"	Huntrix	14	Schwiizergoofe
12 October	"The Fate of Ophelia"	Taylor Swift	The Life of a Showgirl	Taylor Swift
19 October	"The Fate of Ophelia"	Taylor Swift	The Life of a Showgirl	Taylor Swift
26 October	"The Fate of Ophelia"	Taylor Swift	Alles oder nix	SSIO
2 November	"The Fate of Ophelia"	Taylor Swift	Green	Seraina Telli
9 November	"The Fate of Ophelia"	Taylor Swift	Traces	Michael Patrick Kelly
16 November	"The Fate of Ophelia"	Taylor Swift	Lux	Rosalía
23 November	"The Fate of Ophelia"	Taylor Swift	Lux	Rosalía
30 November	"The Fate of Ophelia"	Taylor Swift	Lux	Rosalía
7 December	"All I Want for Christmas Is You"	Mariah Carey	Poussière d'or	Stephan Eicher
14 December	"Last Christmas"	Wham!	Heubode	Trauffer
21 December	"Last Christmas"	Wham!	Wish You Were Here	Pink Floyd
28 December	"Last Christmas"	Wham!	Christmas	Michael Bublé
