= Akon (disambiguation) =

Akon (born 1973) is a Senegalese-American singer.

Akon may also refer to:

== People ==
=== Given name ===
- Akon Bora (born 1952), Indian politician
- Akon Changkou, South Sudanese-Australian fashion model
- Akon Eyakenyi (born 1960), Nigerian politician
- Akon Kuek (born 2004), Finnish footballer

=== Surname ===
- Abdus Sattar Akon (1929–2012), Bangladeshi politician
- Akol Akon (born 2009), Australian footballer
- Deng Deng Akon (born 1964), South Sudanese politician
- Gabriel Akon, known professionally as DyspOra (born c. 1994), South Sudanese-born Australian rapper and activist

== Places ==
- Akon City, a planned community in the M'bour Department of Senegal, named after the singer
- Akon International Airport, a planned airport in Warrap State, South Sudan

== Fictional characters ==
- Akon (阿近), a character from Bleach

== Other uses ==
- "Akon" (song), a 2025 song by Jazeek
- Akon Arena, a football stadium in Würzburg, Germany

== See also ==
- A-Kon, an annual three-day anime convention held in Irving, Texas
- Acon (disambiguation)
