= List of number-one hits of 2026 (Germany) =

The GfK Entertainment charts are record charts compiled by GfK Entertainment on behalf of the German record industry. They include the "Single Top 100" and the "Album Top 100" chart. The chart week runs from Friday to Thursday, and the chart compilations are published on Tuesday for the record industry. The entire top 100 singles and top 100 albums are officially released the following Friday by GfK Entertainment. The charts are based on weekly physical and digital sales and streams of singles and albums, as well as the amount of airplay the songs receive on German radio stations.

== Number-one hits by week ==
Issue date	Song	Artist	Ref.	Album	Artist	Ref.
2 January	"The Fate of Ophelia"	Taylor Swift		The Life of a Showgirl	Taylor Swift	
9 January	"The Fate of Ophelia"	Taylor Swift		The Life of a Showgirl	Taylor Swift	
16 January	"The Fate of Ophelia"	Taylor Swift		Eingenordet	Versengold	
23 January	"The Fate of Ophelia"	Taylor Swift		Euphoria	Schiller	
30 January	"The Fate of Ophelia"	Taylor Swift		Hast du Kurz Zeit	Wincent Weiss	
6 February	"Renn!"	Ayliva		Opium fürs Volk	Die Toten Hosen	
13 February	"DTMF"	Bad Bunny		Debí Tirar Más Fotos	Bad Bunny	
20 February	"Karnevalsmaus"	Druckluft		Wildlive – Live at Olympiahalle	Powerwolf	
27 February	"Opalite"	Taylor Swift		Zeitlos	Howard Carpendale	
6 March	"Lush Life"	Zara Larsson		Deja vu 1/2	Clueso	
13 March	"CDY"	Lacazette and Jazeek		Kiss All The Time. Disco, Occasionally.	Harry Styles	
20 March	"CDY"	Lacazette and Jazeek		Liebe Glaube Monster	Unheilig	
27 March	"Swim"	BTS		Arirang	BTS	
3 April	"Lush Life"	Zara Larsson		Hotel	Johannes Oerding	
10 April	"Lush Life"	Zara Larsson		Arirang	BTS	
17 April	"Dracula"	Tame Impala		4Lap	Jazeek	
24 April	"Beauty and a Beat"	Justin Bieber featuring Nicki Minaj		Zum Glück in die Zukunft III	Marteria	
1 May	"Beauty and a Beat"	Justin Bieber featuring Nicki Minaj		The Great Divide	Noah Kahan	
8 May	"Beauty and a Beat"	Justin Bieber featuring Nicki Minaj		Hit Me Hard and Soft	Billie Eilish	
15 May	"Beauty and a Beat"	Justin Bieber featuring Nicki Minaj		Alpha DNA	Felix Blume	
22 May	"Bangaranga"	Dara		Poppstar	Ikkimel	
29 May	"Beauty and a Beat"	Justin Bieber featuring Nicki Minaj		Stammtischparolen	Tream	
5 June	"Heute Nacht"	Helene Fischer		Trink aus! Wir müssen gehen	Die Toten Hosen	
12 June	"I Knew It, I Knew You"	Taylor Swift		Dinner Party	Niall Horan	
19 June	"Gut genug"	KitschKrieg, Blumengarten and Shirin David		You Seem Pretty Sad for a Girl So in Love	Olivia Rodrigo	
26 June	"Gut genug"	KitschKrieg, Blumengarten and Shirin David		You Seem Pretty Sad for a Girl So in Love	Olivia Rodrigo	
3 July	"Dai Dai"	Shakira and Burna Boy		Aussenseiter Spitzenreiter	Finch	
10 July	"Dai Dai"	Shakira and Burna Boy		Aussenseiter Spitzenreiter	Finch	
17 July	"Dai Dai"	Shakira and Burna Boy		Foreign Tongues	The Rolling Stones	
24 July	"Dai Dai"	Shakira and Burna Boy		Daughter from Hell	Gracie Abrams	
31 July	"Dai Dai"	Shakira and Burna Boy		Lounge Musik	Pashanim	
7 August	"Dai Dai"	Shakira and Burna Boy		Petal	Ariana Grande	
14 August	"Dai Dai"	Shakira and Burna Boy		Tanzneid	Electric Callboy	
21 August	"Dai Dai"	Shakira and Burna Boy		Raheem	Reezy	
28 August	"Dai Dai"	Shakira and Burna Boy		So ist das mit dem Glück	Montez	
4 September	"Dai Dai"	Shakira and Burna Boy		Wildchild	Alex Warren	
11 September	"Dai Dai"	Shakira and Burna Boy		Ein Lächeln im Gesicht	Farin Urlaub	
18 September	"Dai Dai"	Shakira and Burna Boy		1993	KrawallBrüder	
25 September	"Dai Dai"	Shakira and Burna Boy		Kissin' Dynamite	Kissin' Dynamite	
2 October	"Patient Zero"	Taylor Swift		Schatzhauser	Reinhard Mey	
9 October	"Patient Zero"	Taylor Swift		Nashville	Peter Maffay & Johannes Oerding	
16 October	"Patient Zero"	Taylor Swift		Best Of	Andrea Berg	
23 October	"Housewife"	Tate McRae		Ski Aggu Musik	Ski Aggu	
30 October	"Housewife"	Tate McRae		Levi Did It	Bunt.	
6 November	"Housewife"	Tate McRae		POV	Nico Santos	
13 November	"Housewife"	Tate McRae		Requiem for a Village	Steven Wilson	
20 November	"Verschwommen"	Ski Aggu and Ericson		Carnaval de Luz	U2	
