= Tau mich auf =

2025 single by Zartmann

Single by Zartmann
- Language: German
- Released: 31 January 2025
- Genre: Pop
- Length: 1:50
- Label: Bamboo Artists; Epic Records
- Songwriters: Julia Bergen; David Bonk; Moritz Dauner; Jonas Kraft; Aaron Lovac; Zartmann
- Producers: Julia Bergen; David Bonk; Moritz Dauner; Aaron Lovac

Zartmann singles chronology
"Niemand" (2024)	"Tau mich auf" (2025)	"Lass es gehen" (2025)

Music video
- "Tau mich auf" on YouTube

"Tau mich auf" is a song by German singer, rapper and songwriter Zartmann. It was written by Zartmann himself alongside Julia Bergen, David Bonk, Moritz Dauner, Jonas Kraft, and Aaron Lovac and produced by Bergen, Bonk, Dauner, and Lovac. The song was released on 31 January 2025.

== Background and composition ==
"Tau mich auf" was written by Zartmann himself, together with the writing duo DaJu (consisting of Julia Bergen and David Bonk), Moritz Dauner, Jonas Kraft (Cuffa), and Aaron Lovac (Drumla). With the exception of Kraft and Zartmann, the remaining writers were also responsible for the production. The first release of "Tau mich auf" was on 31 January 2025, as a single on the music labels Bamboo Artists and Epic Records. It was released as a digital single track for download and streaming.

Tau mich auf addresses the inner conflict between emotional distance and the longing for closeness. The play tells of a restless life in which the protagonist rushes from day to day, yet is repeatedly confronted with the past and painful experiences. It is about the feeling of being emotionally frozen—a kind of defense mechanism after too many disappointments—and the encounter with a person who could break through these walls.

== Music video ==
The music video for "Tau mich auf" was directed by Luis Frederik. It premiered on 3 February 2025, on the video platform YouTube, where it had over one million views by March 2025.

== Commercial performance ==
"Tau mich auf" entered the German singles chart at number one on 7 February 2025. The song became Zartmann's first number-one hit, as well as his second top 10 success and fourth chart hit after "Wie du manchmal fehlst" (May 2024). It also reached the top of the German-language singles chart. In Austria, the song entered the chart at number three on 11 February 2025, and reached its best position three weeks later at number two; it was only beaten by the top-seller "Wackelkontakt" by Oimara. In Switzerland, the single reached its best position at number seven.

== Charts ==
=== Weekly charts ===
Weekly chart performance for "Tau mich auf"
Chart (2025)	Peak position
Austria (Ö3 Austria Top 40)	2
Germany (GfK)	1
Switzerland (Schweizer Hitparade)	7

=== Year-end charts ===
Year-end chart performance for "Tau mich auf"
Chart (2025)	Position
Austria (Ö3 Austria Top 40)	4
Germany (GfK)	3
Switzerland (Schweizer Hitparade)	31

== Certifications ==
Certifications for "Tau mich auf"
Region	Certification	Certified units/sales
Austria (IFPI Austria)	Gold	15,000^{‡}
Germany (BVMI)	Gold	300,000^{‡}
^{‡} Sales+streaming figures based on certification alone.
