= Naschenweng =

Naschenweng is a German surname. Notable people with the surname include:

- Katharina Naschenweng (born 1997), Austrian footballer
- Melissa Naschenweng (born 1990), Austrian singer and musician
