= List of number-one albums of 2025 (Belgium) =

The Belgian Albums Chart, divided into the two main regions Flanders and Wallonia, ranks the best-performing albums in Belgium, as compiled by Ultratop.

== Flanders ==
List of number-one albums of 2025 in Flanders
Issue date	Album	Artist	Reference
4 January	From Zero	Linkin Park	
11 January	Hit Me Hard and Soft	Billie Eilish	
18 January	Hit Me Hard and Soft	Billie Eilish	
25 January	Balloonerism	Mac Miller	
1 February	Can't Rush Greatness	Central Cee	
8 February	Hurry Up Tomorrow	The Weeknd	
15 February	GNX	Kendrick Lamar	
22 February	Short n' Sweet	Sabrina Carpenter	
1 March	So Close to What	Tate McRae	
8 March	So Close to What	Tate McRae	
15 March	Mayhem	Lady Gaga	
22 March	Alles onder controle	Tourist LeMC	
29 March	#LikeMe – Seizoen 5	#LikeMe Cast	
5 April	Eternal Sunshine	Ariana Grande	
12 April	Mama I Made It	Roxy Dekker	
19 April	#LikeMe – Seizoen 5	#LikeMe Cast	
26 April	Mama I Made It	Roxy Dekker	
3 May	Skeletá	Ghost	
10 May	Hit Me Hard and Soft	Billie Eilish	
17 May	Even in Arcadia	Sleep Token	
24 May	Dagdromer	Maksim	
31 May	Funny Little Fears	Damiano David	
7 June	Bēyāh	Damso	
14 June	God of Angels Trust	Volbeat	
21 June	Gedeeld door ons	Suzan & Freek	
28 June	Idols	Yungblud	
5 July	Virgin	Lorde	
12 July	From Zero	Linkin Park	
19 July	Swag	Justin Bieber	
26 July	Don't Tap the Glass	Tyler, the Creator	
2 August	KPop Demon Hunters (Soundtrack from the Netflix Film)	Various artists	
9 August	Circus	Camille	
16 August	Circus	Camille	
23 August	Hit Me Hard and Soft	Billie Eilish	
30 August	Karma	Stray Kids	
6 September	Man's Best Friend	Sabrina Carpenter	
13 September	KPop Demon Hunters (Soundtrack from the Netflix Film)	Various artists	
20 September	Play	Ed Sheeran	
27 September	KPop Demon Hunters (Soundtrack from the Netflix Film)	Various artists	
4 October	Dit is Guy	Zwangere Guy	
11 October	The Life of a Showgirl	Taylor Swift	
18 October	Gedoe	Pommelien Thijs	
25 October	Gedoe	Pommelien Thijs	
1 November	Gedoe	Pommelien Thijs	
8 November	3	Metejoor	
15 November	Lux	Rosalía	
22 November	Gedoe	Pommelien Thijs	
29 November	Gedoe	Pommelien Thijs	
6 December	Gedoe	Pommelien Thijs	
13 December	Gedoe	Pommelien Thijs	
20 December	Gedoe	Pommelien Thijs	
27 December	Gedoe	Pommelien Thijs	

== Wallonia ==
List of number-one albums of 2025 in Wallonia
Issue date	Album	Artist	Reference
4 January	From Zero	Linkin Park	
11 January	Hit Me Hard and Soft	Billie Eilish	
18 January	Debí Tirar Más Fotos	Bad Bunny	
25 January	Debí Tirar Más Fotos	Bad Bunny	
1 February	Debí Tirar Más Fotos	Bad Bunny	
8 February	Hurry Up Tomorrow	The Weeknd	
15 February	Hurry Up Tomorrow	The Weeknd	
22 February	Le Nord se souvient	Gims	
1 March	Le Nord se souvient	Gims	
8 March	Le Nord se souvient	Gims	
15 March	Mayhem	Lady Gaga	
22 March	Hélé	Helena	
29 March	Hélé	Helena	
5 April	Hélé	Helena	
12 April	Hélé	Helena	
19 April	Diamant noir	Werenoi	
26 April	Diamant noir	Werenoi	
3 May	Diamant noir	Werenoi	
10 May	Le Nord se souvient	Gims	
17 May	Tout s'oublie un jour	Frédéric François	
24 May	Funny Little Fears	Damiano David	
31 May	Portes du désert	Scylla and Furax Barbarossa	
7 June	Bēyāh	Damso	
14 June	Bēyāh	Damso	
21 June	Bēyāh	Damso	
28 June	Mania	Hamza	
5 July	Bēyāh	Damso	
12 July	Bēyāh	Damso	
19 July	Bēyāh	Damso	
26 July	Bēyāh	Damso	
2 August	Bēyāh	Damso	
9 August	Bēyāh	Damso	
16 August	Bēyāh	Damso	
23 August	Le Nord se souvient	Gims	
30 August	Karma	Stray Kids	
6 September	Man's Best Friend	Sabrina Carpenter	
13 September	KPop Demon Hunters (Soundtrack from the Netflix Film)	Various artists	
20 September	Grandeur nature	Florent Pagny	
27 September	Grandeur nature	Florent Pagny	
4 October	Grandeur nature	Florent Pagny	
11 October	The Life of a Showgirl	Taylor Swift	
18 October	The Life of a Showgirl	Taylor Swift	
25 October	The Life of a Showgirl	Taylor Swift	
1 November	Le disque bleu	Benjamin Biolay	
8 November	Dom Perignon Crying	Josman	
15 November	La fuite en avant	Orelsan	
22 November	La fuite en avant	Orelsan	
29 November	Do It	Stray Kids	
6 December	Hélé 2	Helena	
13 December	Memento Mori: Mexico City	Depeche Mode	
20 December	Le Nord se souvient	Gims	
27 December	Lux	Rosalía	

== See also ==
- List of Ultratop 50 number-one singles of 2025
