= Da gfeide Hund =

The Da gfeide Hund [ta:gfaɪ'deˈhʊnt] (English: "the keen dog") is a language and culture award which has been granted since 2024 by the Association for Bavarian language and dialects (Förderverein Bairische Sprache und Dialekte e. V. - FBSD). The price recognizes upcoming contemporary artists who use Bavarian in their art or music, and comes with a cash prize of 4,000 euros.

== Laureates ==
- 2024 - Beni Hafner (Oimara), Bavarian musician from Tegernsee
- 2025 - Mathias Kellner, songwriter and comedian from Lower Bavaria
