= Karma (Stray Kids album) =

- Digital cover

Studio album by Stray Kids
- Released: August 22, 2025
- Studios: JYP (Seoul); Channie's "Room" (Seoul)
- Length: 32:02
- Languages: Korean; English
- Labels: JYP; Republic
- Producers: 3Racha; DallasK; Jun2; Millionboy; Versachoi

Stray Kids chronology
Hollow (2025)	Karma (2025)	Do It (2025)

Singles from Karma
- 1. "Ceremony" Released: August 22, 2025

Karma is the fourth Korean-language studio album (sixth overall) by South Korean boy band Stray Kids. It was released on August 22, 2025, through JYP Entertainment and Republic Records. The album is the follow-up to the group's previous Korean ninth extended play, Ate (2024), and serves as their first full-length Korean studio album since 5-Star (2023).

Inspired by their Dominate World Tour, Karma reflects Stray Kids' achievements, unwavering faith, growth, evolution, hope, challenges, and introspection. 3Racha—Bang Chan, Changbin, and Han—worked on the album during the tour, with collaborators DallasK, Jun2, Millionboy, Ronnie Icon, and Versachoi. To support the album, the group promoted "Ceremony" as its lead single, appeared in various television and online shows, and held the encore shows of the tour, the Dominate: Celebrate, in October at Incheon Asiad Main Stadium.

Commercially, Karma topped the national album charts in various regions: South Korea, Austria, Belgium, France, Germany, Greece, Hungary, Japan, Poland, Portugal, and the United States. The album was the 2025 best-selling album in South Korea and the sixth worldwide, certified triple million by the Korea Music Content Association (KMCA), as well as gold by the Syndicat national de l'édition phonographique, and the Recording Industry Association of America. Karma won Album of the Year at the 2025 MAMA Awards and Best Music 10 and Best Selling Album at 2025 Korea Grand Music Awards, and Album Daesang at the 40th Golden Disc Awards.

== Background ==
In 2024, Stray Kids released two Korean-language albums: the ninth extended play (EP) Ate and the first mixtape Hop to critical acclaim. Both record topped the charts in their home country South Korea and the United States, among other countries. Before the releases, the group had renewed their contracts with JYP Entertainment ahead of the expiration. Furthermore, the band was also a part of lineups of artist featured on the soundtracks of superhero film Deadpool & Wolverine and the second season of animated fantasy series Arcane, titled "Slash" and "Come Play" (with Young Miko and Tom Morello), respectively. Stray Kids embarked on their Dominate World Tour in support of Ate from August 2024 to July 2025.

On January 6, 2025, Stray Kids announced plans to release two albums and hold an encore concert of the Dominate World Tour in Seoul in 2025 via the video "Step Out 2025", outlining their accomplishments in 2024 and plans for the next year. On July 25, the band announced the fourth studio album, titled Karma, via trailer. Set in the futuristic theme of the year 2081, the trailer depicts an annual sports competition called "Karma Sports", being comparable to the Olympic Games or the World Cup. All eight members portray the competition's former champion from 2074 to 2080 in order: Hyunjin, I.N, Bang Chan, Lee Know and Seungmin, Han, Changbin, and Felix, whose all outfits feature leopard or zebra prints. All the champions receive "Karma Coin" and desire to compete for the championship once again in 2081.

The album title refers to karma with the word play of "calmer", expressing the meaning of "when bad karma comes, [Stray Kids] will calm it with our good karma." Changbin explained the reason at the album's press conference, said "We want to create the album that contains the positive karma of the achievements and results we have with [fans] so far."

== Production and music ==
Karma comprised 11 tracks, being thirty-two minutes and two seconds long. Stray Kids' in-house production team 3Racha—Bang Chan, Changbin, and Han—participated in writing all tracks for the album with DallasK, Jun2, Millionboy, Ronnie Icon, and Versachoi. Most of them were worked during the 11 months of the Dominate World Tour, which was the time that inspired the album, while some tracks were prepared ahead the tour. Heavily centered on the sport concept, the album's main theme "reflects the achievements [Stray Kids have] made so far", and tells their "unwavering faith in oneself, believing that one can shape one's destiny through choices and actions." The songs' lyrics speak of growth, evolution, hope, challenges, and introspection. Candidates for the album's lead single included "Creed", "Ceremony", "In My Head", "Phoenix", and "Half Time"; "Ceremony" was eventually selected.

=== Songs ===
Karma opens with "Bleep", a boom bap track, expressing Stray Kids' confidence and ignoring negative noise, using the literal bleep censor sound. "Ceremony" is an EDM trap and baile funk track about celebrations of the achievement and success forged through perseverance and hard work, as well as the journey of overcoming obstacles. A dark rock and trap sound in mumble rap style, "Creed" talks about the group's convictions and sticking to their guts. Billboard's Amina Ayoud noted a reminder of "Warren G mixed with Anti-era Rihanna". In "Mess", the group expresses emotions and regret after breakup with emo rap genre with "crisp" guitar riffs. The pop-rock track with bright guitar track "In My Head", reminiscing about the early 2000s pop-punk music, and rock, explores personal worries in life.

In the second half, "Half Time", inspired by renewing the contract with JYP Entertainment, centered around the turning point of half-time in sports to bolster the resolve and confidence for the second half. It features maximalist boom-bap rap sound woven by percussion and American football sound effects. Inspired by Avicii and Zedd, "Phoenix", a mixing of drum and bass and upbeat EDM, depicts the group's overcoming hardships and continuing to rise to the occasion, comparing to phoenix. "Ghost" is a big beat-influenced track with "heart-pounding bass, stabbing synths, and emotional organ sounds". Despite upbeat rhythm, it talks about loss, numbness, and emptiness, yet still holds onto hope. "0801", named after August 1, the day the group announced the fan club name, "Stay", is a fan-dedicated track with synthwave pop sound, promising that they will "stay forever" and "stay here" for fans. The album concludes with the "Festival" and English versions of "Ceremony".

== Release and promotion ==
Karma was released on August 22, 2025. The album's pre-orders and pre-save began on the same day as its trailer premiere, coming in 16 versions: Karma (limited), Ceremony, Hooray, eight Accordion, Compact, SKZoo (Nemo), and three vinyls. On July 27, the group posted football-match-table-styled pre-release promotional itinerary for Karma, as well as "2025 Stayweek" contents to celebrate the seventh anniversary of the band's official fan club Stay. The next four days, they unveiled the track list with "festive" background of red smoke bomb and blue confetti on the blue sky; "Ceremony" serves as the album's lead single. KBS deemed "Bleep" unsuitable for broadcast due to the lyrics "promot[ing] anti-social or unhealthy values." The snippet of the album's tracks were teased: "0801" via the song's "street video" teaser; "Bleep", "Creed", and "Half Time" via video series "Unveil: Track"; and all tracks via the EDM-based mashup video.

The teaser images were released in three sets. The first reminisces about a high-end magazine cover, showcasing the members' mixing and matching of a formal blazer and athletic elements, along with hand wrap wrapped around each hand and finger, and flashy accessories. The second expresses the members in black-and-white modified taekwondo's uniform striking various poses, surrounded by vibrantly colored lights in a stadium-like space. The third depicts members in red-white costumes against the background of red smoke on the sky. Before the release, on August 20, Stray Kids held Karma's pre-listening session in Seoulfor fans who were selected by purchasing the album via JYP's own Fan Shop, and released the video Intro: Karma to discuss the album's production and behind-the-scene.

On the release day, Stray Kids held a press conference for Karma at Conrad Seoul, and an accompanying music video for "Ceremony" premiered in conjunction with the album release, featuring cameo from professional gamer Faker. The album's three further music videos are "Bleep", "0801" (street version), and "Creed". To promote the album, Stray Kids performed "Ceremony" at Music Bank, Show! Music Core, Inkigayo, and M Countdown, and a medley of their songs at Killing Voice. The selected members appeared on the television programs SBS Nightline MBC 2 News Side Story, Talkpawon 25 O'Clock, and Please Take Care of My Refrigerator, and web shows, such as Salon Drip 2, Vanity Fair, GQ's Actually Us, and Teen Vogue, etc. The group opened pop-up store to sell the album's limited merchandise from August 23 to September 3 at Lotte World Mall and Lotte Cinema World Tower, Seoul. They partnered with Spotify for "Staydium" pop-up store in Seoul, Jakarta, and Tokyo, and TikTok for the in-app campaign #Karma. Stray Kids held the encore shows of the Dominate World Tour, titled Dominate: Celebrate, on October 18 and 19 at Incheon Asiad Main Stadium, where they performed "Ceremony", "Bleep", "Half Time", and "In My Head" from the album.

== Critical reception ==
Professional ratings
Review scores
Source	Rating
AllMusic	4.5/5 stars
IZM	2/5 stars

Han Sung-hyun of IZM gave Karma two out of five stars, which "leans toward the negative". He wrote that the album's first half tracks are solid. Still, the second half is relatively stable, and has a weaker impact than its predecessors, "falls short of the predictable metaphor," and "the unexpected brilliance of the tracks" on Rock-Star (2023) and Maxident (2022). Meanwhile, Han chose "Bleep" and "Half Time" as his recommendations. The Korea Times's Inna Christine Cabel called the album "a force to be reckoned with — a fierce musical identity that sets them apart in the K-pop industry," and praised the group that "dare to dream further, choosing to curate a genre-spanning record with a fearlessness nourished by artistic growth and influenced by their travels across the world". Writing for AllMusic, Neil Z. Yeung rated the album 4.5 stars, lauding "a triumphant salvo that finds them at the peak of their powers" and "every track could have been a single" as it has no clear highlight track as "each of the original songs is worth a listen".

=== Year-end lists ===
Year-end lists for Karma
Publication	List	Rank	Ref.
Billboard	The 25 Best K-Pop Albums of 2025: Staff Picks	8	

== Accolades ==
List of awards and nominations received by Karma
Ceremony	Year	Category	Result	Ref.
Asia Artist Awards	2025	Album of the Year	Won	
Asian Pop Music Awards	2025	Best Group	Nominated	
Asian Pop Music Awards	2025	Top 20 Albums of the Year	Won	
D Awards	2026	Album of the Year	Won	
Hanteo Music Awards	2026	Best Album (Daesang)	Won	
Golden Disc Awards	2026	Album Daesang	Won	
Golden Disc Awards	2026	Album Bonsang	Won	
Korea Grand Music Awards	2025	Best Music 10	Won	
Korea Grand Music Awards	2025	Best Selling Album	Won	
MAMA Awards	2025	Album of the Year	Won	

== Commercial performance ==
On Spotify, Karma received 18.26 million streams, breaking the highest single-day streams by K-pop album in 2025. According to Hanteo Chart, the album sold over two million copies on the first day of the release, and 3.03 million within one week, becoming the best-selling 2025 album in South Korea. Karma debuted at number one on the Circle Album Chart for the week of August 17 to 23, 2025, with 2,277,910 copies. The Nemo edition peaked at number two with 223,267 copies. The Korea Music Content Association (KMCA) certified the album triple million for surpassing three million shipments, while the Nemo version was certified platinum for 250,000 shipments. Eventually, the album finished 2025 as the year's best-selling album in South Korea. In Japan, Karma debuted atop the Oricon Albums Chart and the Combined Albums Chart, the fourth consecutive and seventh overall number-one album, selling 146,000 physical copies in that week. The album also topped the national album charts in Austria, Belgium, France, Germany, Greece, Hungary, Poland, and Portugal. In France, the album received gold certification for 50,000 units. The International Federation of the Phonographic Industry (IFPI) reported that Karma was the sixth best-selling album in 2025 worldwide.

In the United States, Karma entered Billboard 200 at number one dated September 6, 2025, becoming the first ever act in Billboard history to debut atop the chart with the first seven entries, and the most number one albums among musical groups in the 21st century, surpassing BTS, Linkin Park, and Dave Matthews Band. The album received 313,000 album-equivalent units in its first week, the third biggest week sales in 2025 at the time, behind Morgan Wallen's I'm the Problem and the Weeknd's Hurry Up Tomorrow. The album-equivalent units comprises 296,000 pure sales, topped the Top Album Sales and being the second largest weeks after Hurry Up Tomorrow; 1,000 track equivalent album; and 23.12 million on-demand streams, debuted at number 34 on the Top Streaming Albums. Karma was also the 29th mostly non-English-language album to reach number one. The second in 2025 since Bad Bunny's Debí Tirar Más Fotos. The album also topped the World Albums for 10 non-consecutive weeks. According to Luminate, Karma sold 585,000 copies in the US as of December 2025.

== Track listing ==
Karma track listing
No.	Title	Lyrics	Music	Arrangement	Length
1.	"Bleep" (삐처리)	Bang Chan (3Racha); Changbin (3Racha); Han (3Racha)	Bang Chan; Changbin; Han; Versachoi	Versachoi; Bang Chan	2:47
2.	"Ceremony"	Bang Chan; Changbin; Han	Bang Chan; Changbin; Han; Versachoi	Versachoi; Bang Chan	2:44
3.	"Creed"	Bang Chan; Changbin; Han	Bang Chan; Changbin; Han; Millionboy	Millionboy; Bang Chan	2:41
4.	"Mess" (엉망)	Han; Bang Chan	Han; Bang Chan; Millionboy	Millionboy; Bang Chan	3:29
5.	"In My Head"	Changbin; Bang Chan	Changbin; Bang Chan; Jun2	Jun2; Bang Chan	2:56
6.	"Half Time" (반전)	Bang Chan; Changbin; Han	Bang Chan; Changbin; Han; Versachoi	Versachoi; Bang Chan	2:50
7.	"Phoenix"	Bang Chan; Changbin; Han	Bang Chan; Changbin; Han; Ronnie Icon; DallasK	DallasK; Bang Chan	3:02
8.	"Ghost"	Bang Chan; Changbin; Versachoi	Bang Chan; Changbin; Versachoi	Versachoi; Bang Chan	2:33
9.	"0801"	Bang Chan	Bang Chan; Versachoi	Versachoi	3:24
10.	"Ceremony" (Festival version)	Bang Chan; Changbin; Han	Bang Chan; Changbin; Han; Versachoi	Versachoi	2:52
11.	"Ceremony" (English version)	Bang Chan; Changbin; Han	Bang Chan; Changbin; Han; Versachoi	Versachoi; Bang Chan	2:44
Total length:					32:02

== Credits and personnel ==
Musicians

- Stray Kids – lead vocals (all), background vocals (1–2, 5–7, 9–11)
  - Bang Chan (3Racha) – background vocals (3–4, 8), instruments (1–6, 8, 11), computer programming (1–2, 5–6, 8, 11), vocal direction (all)
  - Changbin (3Racha) – background vocals (3), vocal direction (1–3, 5–6, 10–11)
  - Han (3Racha) – background vocals (3–4), vocal direction (1–4, 6, 10–11)
  - Felix – background vocals (3)
- Versachoi – instruments (1–2, 6, 8–11), computer programming (1–2, 6, 8–11), vocal direction (1–2, 6–11)
- Millionboy – instruments (3–4), vocal direction (3)
- Jun2 – instruments (5), computer programming (5)
- Nickko Young – guitar (5)

Technical

- Seo Eun-il – recording (1, 6–7, 11)
- Eom Se-hee – recording (1–2, 4–5, 7, 9–11), digital editing (9)
- Bang Chan (3Racha) – recording (1–3, 7, 10–11), digital editing (1–4, 7, 9–11)
- Goo Hye-jin – recording (1–3, 6, 8)
- Kwak Bo-eun – recording (5)
- Lee Chang-hoon – recording (6, 8–9)
- Lee Kyeong-won – digital editing (1)
- Jang Woo-young – digital editing (2, 10–11)
- A.Zero – digital editing (5), mixing (5)
- Kwon Yu-jin – digital editing (6, 8)
- Versachoi – digital editing (6), mixing (10)
- Elliot Harper – digital editing (7), mixing (7)
- Dallas Koehlke – digital editing (7), mixing (7)
- Yoon Won-kwon – mixing (1, 3, 6, 8)
- Manny Marroquin – mixing (2, 11)
- Chris Galland – mix engineering (2, 11)
  - Ben Rugg – assistant (2, 11)
- Stay Tuned – mixing (4)
- Kwon Nam-woo – mastering (all)
- Gu Jong-pil – mixing in Dolby Atmos (all)
  - P.O.D – assistant (all)

Locations

- JYP Studios – recording (all), digital editing (9)
- Channie's "Room" – recording (1–3, 7, 10–11), digital editing (2–4, 7, 9–11)
- Millennium Mix Lab – digital editing (5), mixing (5)
- Madmiix – mixing (1, 3, 6, 8)
- Larrabee Studios – mixing (2, 11)
- Stay Tuned Studio – mixing (4)
- 821 Sound Mastering – mastering (all)
- Klang Studio – mixing in Dolby Atmos (all)

== Charts ==
=== Weekly charts ===
Weekly chart performance for Karma
Chart (2025)	Peak position
Australian Albums (ARIA)	3
Austrian Albums (Ö3 Austria)	1
Belgian Albums (Ultratop Flanders)	1
Belgian Albums (Ultratop Wallonia)	1
Canadian Albums (Billboard)	11
Croatian International Albums (HDU)	1
Czech Albums (ČNS IFPI)	14
Danish Albums (Hitlisten)	5
Dutch Albums (Album Top 100)	3
Finnish Albums (Suomen virallinen lista)	11
French Albums (SNEP)	1
German Albums (Offizielle Top 100)	1
Greek Albums (IFPI)	1
Hungarian Albums (MAHASZ)	1
Icelandic Albums (Tónlistinn)	4
Irish Albums (IRMA)	52
Irish Independent Albums (IRMA)	6
Italian Albums (FIMI)	3
Japanese Albums (Oricon)	1
Japanese Combined Albums (Oricon)	1
Japanese Hot Albums (Billboard Japan)	6
Lithuanian Albums (AGATA)	9
New Zealand Albums (RMNZ)	7
Norwegian Albums (IFPI Norge)	34
Polish Albums (ZPAV)	1
Portuguese Albums (AFP)	1
Portuguese Albums (AFP) Compact version	51
Scottish Albums (Official Charts)	18
Slovak Albums (ČNS IFPI)	5
South Korean Albums (Circle)	1
Spanish Albums (Promusicae)	6
Swedish Albums (Sverigetopplistan)	5
Swiss Albums (Schweizer Hitparade)	2
UK Albums (Official Charts)	22
UK Independent Albums (Official Charts)	32
US Billboard 200	1
US World Albums (Billboard)	1

=== Monthly charts ===
Monthly chart performance for Karma
Chart (2025)	Position
Japanese Albums (Oricon)	1
South Korean Albums (Circle)	1

=== Year-end charts ===
Year-end chart performance for Karma
Chart (2025)	Position
Australian Albums (ARIA)	96
Austrian Albums (Ö3 Austria)	7
Belgian Albums (Ultratop Flanders)	31
Belgian Albums (Ultratop Wallonia)	45
Croatian International Albums (HDU)	16
French Albums (SNEP)	47
German Albums (Offizielle Top 100)	31
Global Albums (IFPI)	6
Hungarian Albums (MAHASZ)	13
Japanese Albums (Oricon)	15
Japanese Download Albums (Billboard Japan)	49
Polish Albums (ZPAV)	75
South Korean Albums (Circle)	1
Swiss Albums (Schweizer Hitparade)	48
US Billboard 200	128
US World Albums (Billboard)	2

== Certifications and sales ==
Certifications and sales for Karma
Region	Certification	Certified units/sales
France (SNEP)	Gold	50,000^{‡}
South Korea (KMCA)	3× Million	3,000,000^{^}
South Korea (KMCA) Nemo	Platinum	250,000^{^}
United States (RIAA)	Gold	500,000^{‡}
Summaries
Worldwide (IFPI)	—	3,490,000
^{^} Shipments figures based on certification alone.^{‡} Sales+streaming figures based on certification alone.

== Release history ==
Release dates and formats for Karma
Region	Date	Format	Version	Label	Ref.
Various	August 22, 2025	Digital download; streaming	Standard	JYP; Republic	
Various	August 22, 2025	CD	Limited; standard	JYP; Republic	
South Korea	August 22, 2025	Nemo	SKZoo	JYP; Republic	
United States	August 22, 2025	Vinyl	Vinyl	JYP; Republic	
United States	August 22, 2025	Digital download	Exclusive digital	JYP; Republic	

== See also ==
- List of Billboard 200 number-one albums of 2025
- List of Circle Album Chart number ones of 2025
- List of number-one albums of 2025 (Belgium)
- List of number-one albums of 2025 (Portugal)
- List of number-one hits of 2025 (Austria)
- List of number-one hits of 2025 (France)
- List of number-one hits of 2025 (Germany)
- List of Oricon number-one albums of 2025
