= List of Dutch Top 40 number-one singles of 2025 =

This is a list of the Dutch Top 40 number-one singles of 2025. The Dutch Top 40 is a chart that ranks the best-performing singles of the Netherlands. It is published every week by radio station Qmusic.

== Chart history ==
List of Dutch Top 40 number-one singles of 2025
Issue date	Song	Artist(s)	Ref.
4 January	"Die with a Smile"	Lady Gaga and Bruno Mars	
11 January	"Die with a Smile"	Lady Gaga and Bruno Mars	
18 January	"Apt."	Rosé and Bruno Mars	
25 January	"Apt."	Rosé and Bruno Mars	
1 February	"Apt."	Rosé and Bruno Mars	
8 February	"Apt."	Rosé and Bruno Mars	
15 February	"Apt."	Rosé and Bruno Mars	
22 February	"Apt."	Rosé and Bruno Mars	
1 March	"Apt."	Rosé and Bruno Mars	
8 March	"Apt."	Rosé and Bruno Mars	
15 March	"Apt."	Rosé and Bruno Mars	
22 March	"Apt."	Rosé and Bruno Mars	
29 March	"Ordinary"	Alex Warren	
5 April	"Ordinary"	Alex Warren	
12 April	"Ordinary"	Alex Warren	
19 April	"Ordinary"	Alex Warren	
26 April	"Ordinary"	Alex Warren	
3 May	"Ordinary"	Alex Warren	
10 May	"Ordinary"	Alex Warren	
17 May	"Ordinary"	Alex Warren	
24 May	"C'est la vie"	Claude	
31 May	"Ordinary"	Alex Warren	
7 June	"Ordinary"	Alex Warren	
14 June	"Ordinary"	Alex Warren	
21 June	"Ordinary"	Alex Warren	
28 June	"Ordinary"	Alex Warren	
5 July	"Ordinary"	Alex Warren	
12 July	"Ordinary"	Alex Warren	
19 July	"Ordinary"	Alex Warren	
26 July	"Ordinary"	Alex Warren	
2 August	"Azizam"	Ed Sheeran	
9 August	"Azizam"	Ed Sheeran	
16 August	"Azizam"	Ed Sheeran	
23 August	"Blessings"	Calvin Harris featuring Clementine Douglas	
30 August	"Blessings"	Calvin Harris featuring Clementine Douglas	
6 September	"Blessings"	Calvin Harris featuring Clementine Douglas	
13 September	"Man I Need"	Olivia Dean	
20 September	"Man I Need"	Olivia Dean	
27 September	"Man I Need"	Olivia Dean	
4 October	"Man I Need"	Olivia Dean	
11 October	"Man I Need"	Olivia Dean	
18 October	"Man I Need"	Olivia Dean	
25 October	"Man I Need"	Olivia Dean	
1 November	"Man I Need"	Olivia Dean	
8 November	"Man I Need"	Olivia Dean	
15 November	"The Fate of Ophelia"	Taylor Swift	
22 November	"The Fate of Ophelia"	Taylor Swift	
29 November	"The Fate of Ophelia"	Taylor Swift	
6 December	"The Fate of Ophelia"	Taylor Swift	
13 December	"The Fate of Ophelia"	Taylor Swift	
20 December	"The Fate of Ophelia"	Taylor Swift	
27 December	"The Fate of Ophelia"	Taylor Swift	

== Number-one artists ==
Position	Artist	Weeks No. 1
1	Alex Warren	17
2	Bruno Mars	12
3	Rosé	10
4	Olivia Dean	9
5	Taylor Swift	7
6	Ed Sheeran	3
6	Calvin Harris	3
6	Clementine Douglas	3
7	Lady Gaga	2
8	Claude	1

== See also ==
- 2025 in music
