= Acon =

Acon or ACON may refer to:

- Acon, Eure, a commune in the Eure department in northern France
- Aconitum, a plant used in homeopathy
- Åcon, science fiction convention held in Mariehamn, Åland, Finland
- Africa Cup of Nations, a football tournament
- ACON Investments, American international private equity investment company

== People with the surname ==
- Daniel Acon (born 1958), American special effects coordinator

== See also ==
- Akon (born 1973), American crunk and hip hop recording artist
- Akon (disambiguation)
- A-Kon, anime convention held in Dallas, Texas
