= The Fate of Ophelia =

2025 single by Taylor Swift

Single by Taylor Swift

from the album The Life of a Showgirl
- Released: October 3, 2025
- Studio: MXM; Shellback (Stockholm)
- Genre: Dance-pop; synth-pop; funk
- Length: 3:46
- Label: Republic
- Songwriters: Taylor Swift; Max Martin; Shellback
- Producers: Taylor Swift; Max Martin; Shellback

Taylor Swift singles chronology
"I Can Do It with a Broken Heart" (2024)	"The Fate of Ophelia" (2025)	"Opalite" (2026)

Music video
- "The Fate of Ophelia" on YouTube

"The Fate of Ophelia" is a song by the American singer-songwriter Taylor Swift and the lead single from her twelfth studio album, The Life of a Showgirl. The song was released on October 3, 2025, through Republic Records. Swift wrote and produced "The Fate of Ophelia" with Max Martin and Shellback. It is a dance-pop, synth-pop, and funk song with a new wave groove. The track opens with a drum roll and minor piano chords, progressing into an upbeat arrangement of steel guitars, synthesizers, and Omnichords, over a driving bassline. Lyrically, Swift was inspired by Ophelia, a character who drowns due to madness from grief and romantic rejection in William Shakespeare's tragedy Hamlet. The song addresses a soulmate who saves Swift from a destiny of death like that of Ophelia.

Music critics generally praised "The Fate of Ophelia" for its literary influences and opined that the production choices resulted in a catchy melody, while some took issue with the lyrics' conventional tropes and interpretation of Shakespeare's Ophelia. Commercially, the single became the most-streamed song in a day and a week on the streaming platform Spotify. It peaked atop the Billboard Global 200 and became Swift's first number-one single in Austria, Denmark, Germany, Norway, Spain, and the Netherlands. In the United States, "The Fate of Ophelia" spent 10 weeks atop the Billboard Hot 100, marking Swift's longest-running number-one song. It has been certified multi-platinum in Australia, Belgium, Canada, New Zealand, Portugal, and the United Kingdom, diamond in France, and triple diamond in Brazil.

Swift wrote and directed the song's music video, which premiered as part of the album's promotional film, The Official Release Party of a Showgirl. The video draws on various historical, cultural, and artistic inspirations of female performers, portraying Swift as a showgirl across different periods of time. She worked with the cinematographer Rodrigo Prieto, the choreographer Mandy Moore, and the production designer Ethan Tobman on the video, and cast her band and dance crew from the Eras Tour—the tour that inspired the album. "The Fate of Ophelia" received several accolades, including Video of the Year at the 2026 MTV Video Music Awards and Best Music Video at the 2026 iHeartRadio Music Awards, as well as a nomination for Record of the Year at the 2027 Grammy Awards.

== Background and release ==
The American singer-songwriter Taylor Swift created her twelfth studio album, The Life of a Showgirl, to reflect her triumphant state of mind amidst the success of the Eras Tour and her romantic relationship with the American football player Travis Kelce throughout 2024. She announced the album during the August 13, 2025, episode of Travis and Jason Kelce's podcast New Heights; "The Fate of Ophelia" was revealed as the opening track. During the episode, Swift discussed William Shakespeare's tragedy Hamlet, specifically the descent into madness and death by drowning of the character Ophelia, which influenced the album's cover artwork.

"The Fate of Ophelia" was released as the lead single from The Life of a Showgirl. On October 3, 2025, concurrently with the album's release, Universal Music Group released the song to radio airplay in Italy, and its music video premiered as part of the film Taylor Swift: The Official Release Party of a Showgirl, before being released onto YouTube two days later. In the United States, Republic Records released the song to hot adult contemporary radio on October 6 and to contemporary hit radio on October 7. Throughout October, "The Fate of Ophelia" was released on limited-time CD singles and download (including the original, acoustic, and instrumental versions). In December, the single was released on 7-inch vinyl. Four alternate versions of the song were released: an acoustic "Alone in My Tower" version, and three remixes by Loud Luxury, the Chainsmokers, and Telykast and XanTz. All three remixes were accompanied by extended versions.

== Production and music ==
"The Fate of Ophelia"
The composition of "The Fate of Ophelia" includes a prominent bassline, synthesizers, a steel guitar, Omnichords, keyboards.

Swift wrote and produced "The Fate of Ophelia" with Max Martin and Shellback. The track was recorded at Shellback Studios and produced at MXM Studios, both in Stockholm, Sweden. At 3 minutes and 46 seconds, "The Fate of Ophelia" is a dance-pop, synth-pop, and funk track, with a new wave groove. The production begins with a drum roll and minor-key piano chords and progresses into an upbeat production driven by cascading synthesizers, steel guitars, Omnichords, and a driving bassline. Swift's singing, mostly in her lower register in the verses, is assisted by reverb effects.

Critics compared the song to the music of other artists and Swift's past works. Some reviews likened "The Fate of Ophelia" to the music of Fleetwood Mac; Slate's Chris Molanphy wrote that the opening drum roll evoked their song "Dreams" (1977). According to Clash's Lauren Hague, the song is a 2020s take on 2000s funk-pop, reminiscent of Duffy's "Mercy" (2008) and Adele's "Rumour Has It" (2011). Mikael Wood of the Los Angeles Times wrote that the song evoked the British new wave duo Eurythmics, and Ann Powers of NPR compared some production elements to those in Stevie Nicks's "Stand Back" (1983), Gorillaz's "Clint Eastwood" (2001), and Swift's "Wildest Dreams" (2015). Giselle Au-Nhien Nguyen of The Sydney Morning Herald opined that the track has a "darker tone" that recalls Swift's 2017 album Reputation. Meanwhile, Jon Pareles from The New York Times likened the minor-key piano sounds to the production of her 2020 album Folklore.

== Lyrics ==
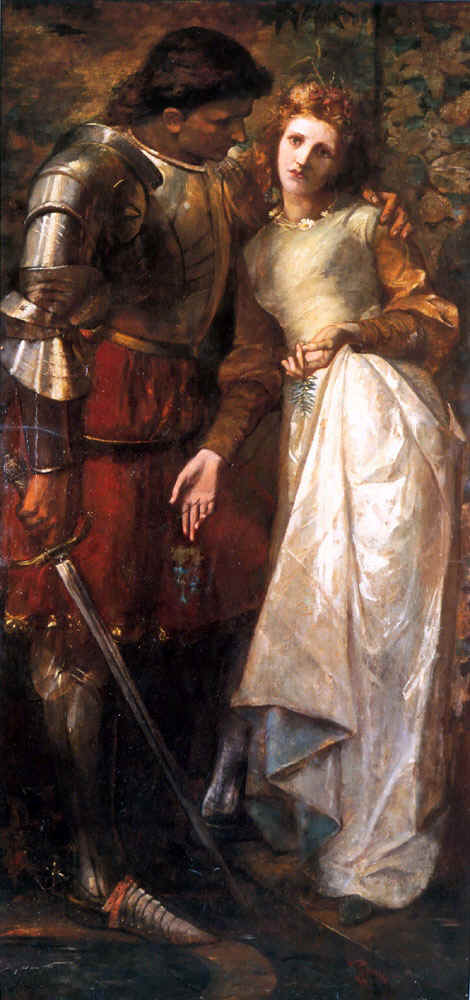
The bridge references Act 1, scene iii of William Shakespeare's Hamlet, where Ophelia confides in her brother Laertes (here portrayed in W. G. Wills's c. 1880 painting).

The lyrics of "The Fate of Ophelia" were influenced by Swift and Kelce's relationship. According to Swift, the idea for the track came while she was in the studio with Martin and Shellback, scrolling through her list of song ideas on her smartphone. As Shellback was playing a "really cool chord progression", Swift came across the word "Ophelia" in her list and imagined a scenario where Ophelia did not go insane and die, but instead met someone who treated her well. From there, she conceived the hook, "You saved my heart from the fate of Ophelia."

In the song, Swift's narrator pledges loyalty to a man who saved her from a fate of "insanity", "drowning", "deception", "purgatory", and ultimately death, similar to that of Ophelia. Ophelia's tragedy is referenced in the second verse: "The eldest daughter of a nobleman/ Ophelia lived in fantasy/ But love was a cold bed full of scorpions/ The venom stole her sanity." The refrain depicts Swift's narrator as "alone in the tower", waiting for her suitor to come. He then "dug her out of [her] grave", which rescued her from death. The bridge ("'Tis locked inside my memory/ And only you possess the key") references Act 1, scene iii of Hamlet, where Ophelia tells her brother Laertes: "Tis in my memory locked, and you yourself shall keep the key of it."

According to various publications, the song contains real-life references to Kelce, including his career as a footballer, his public declaration of affection for Swift, and his frequent use of the phrase "keep it one hundred". Some interpretations of "The Fate of Ophelia" likened its narrative to that of Swift's "Love Story" (2008), which was inspired by another Shakespearean tragedy, Romeo and Juliet. Both songs depict happy romantic endings, contrary to Shakespeare's conclusions; Swift herself acknowledged that this was the second time, after "Love Story", that she attempted to rewrite a Shakespearean ending. According to Serena Trowbridge, a scholar of Victorian literature, "The Fate of Ophelia" was possibly also inspired by the Pre-Raphaelite model and poet Elizabeth Siddal, who was the muse for John Everett Millais's early 1850s painting Ophelia, which influenced The Life of a Showgirl's cover artwork.

== Critical reception ==
"The Fate of Ophelia" received generally positive reviews for its literary inspiration and production. Multiple critics selected the song as a highlight on The Life of a Showgirl, most of whom described the composition and production as clever that resulted in a catchy melody. Rolling Stone ranked "The Fate of Ophelia" eighth on their list of the 100 best songs of 2025, and Billboard placed it at number 14 on their year-end list. Powers, Ludovic Hunter-Tilney of the Financial Times, and Jason Lipshutz of Billboard complimented the transition and build-up from the piano to the bassline. Lipshutz ranked it the second-best song of the album behind "Ruin the Friendship".

Maya Georgi of Rolling Stone commended the "tantalizing" melody and "wondrous" combination of instruments, while Matthew Dwyer of PopMatters highlighted the dynamic composition and "glamorous tension". Georgi and Hague opined that the track embraced a new musical direction for Swift. Swift's vocals were also a subject of praise: Hague opined that her lower register enhanced the track, Hunter-Tilney described her singing as having "characteristic commitment and charisma", and Powers opined that her voice "has never sounded stronger", assisted by reverb that made her sound "massive and intimate at the same time". On a less enthusiastic side, Spencer Kornhaber of The Atlantic commented that the song was "relatively strong, if unexpectedly downcast". Molanphy said that although "The Fate of Ophelia" was Swift's "most banger-adjacent" single in the 2020s, it still contained a "broodiness" that more resembled Folklore than her 2010s "frothy, peppy bops".

The reception of the lyrics was not as uniformly positive. The Independent's Roisin O'Connor dubbed "The Fate of Ophelia" a sublime song for its "literary flair", and Hague commented that the track exhibited Swift's signature confessional songwriting with poetic verses and a tongue-in-cheek refrain. Comparing it to "Love Story", Tom Breihan of Stereogum wrote that both songs "[miss] the entire point" of the Shakespearean tragedies, but "that kind of writerly excess" still turned out engaging and "fucking rules". In a mixed review, Carlos Marcos of El País praised the song's "original" production but contended that it was burdened by the "plaintive" lyrics. Will Hodgkinson of The Times opined that although the lyrics were poetic, the analogy comparing Swift to Ophelia "doesn't really work".

Some reviewers debated the progressive nature of the lyrics. Hunter-Tilney wrote that the lyrics conflating "doomed Ophelia with a Rapunzel-style figure waiting in a tower for a heroic lover" felt misplaced. In congruence, The New York Times' Lindsay Zoladz commented that it was dispiriting that Swift reduced Ophelia to "just another princess waiting for her Prince Charming". In a more moderate take, Trowbridge opined that the narrative of a woman waiting for a rescuer was not progressive, but it helped explore "the public face of women" and their painful experiences in the context of the album as a whole. In Psychology Today, the psychotherapist Whitney Coulson wrote that "The Fate of Ophelia" captures the "emotional alchemy" of female pain in the context of patriarchy and popular culture, providing psychological insight into "how easily a woman's pain is rewritten as instability" through the use of literary archetypes.

== Commercial performance ==
On the streaming platform Spotify, "The Fate of Ophelia" broke the records for the highest single-day streams and the highest single-week streams, becoming the first song to accumulate 30 million streams in a single day. The single topped the Billboard Global 200 chart for seven weeks. It peaked atop the record charts of over 26 territories, including Belgium (Flanders), Canada, Iceland, Ireland, New Zealand, Portugal, Singapore, the Philippines, and the United Arab Emirates.

"The Fate of Ophelia" marked Swift's first number-one single in Austria, Denmark, Germany, Spain, and the Netherlands. In France, it debuted at number four and became her highest-charting solo single, surpassing "Shake It Off" (2014). "The Fate of Ophelia" spent 15 weeks at number one in Canada; 14 weeks in Switzerland; 13 weeks in Germany; 12 weeks in Austria; 10 weeks in Norway and the Netherlands; nine weeks in Ireland; and eight weeks in Belgium (Flanders). In the United Kingdom, "The Fate of Ophelia" debuted atop the UK singles chart with 132,000 first-week units, registering the largest first-week sales of the year and of Swift's career. It spent seven non-consecutive weeks atop the chart, becoming her longest-running number-one song in the United Kingdom. The single has been certified triple diamond in Brazil; diamond in France; quadruple platinum in Portugal; triple platinum in Canada and New Zealand; double platinum in Australia, Belgium, Poland, Spain, and the United Kingdom; and platinum in Austria, Denmark, Germany, and Italy.

In the United States, "The Fate of Ophelia" became Swift's 13th number-one single on the Billboard Hot 100, debuting atop the chart with 92.5 million on-demand streams. It spent 10 non-consecutive weeks at number one on the Hot 100, becoming her longest-running number-one song. After being made available for digital downloads, the single became Swift's record-extending 30th number-one song on the Digital Song Sales. On the US airplay charts, "The Fate of Ophelia" debuted in the top 10 of Pop Airplay, Adult Pop Airplay, and Adult Contemporary. On Pop Airplay, it became the first song in history to debut in the top-10 region and subsequently became Swift's record-extending 14th number-one single, spending five weeks at number one. The track spent four weeks at number one on Adult Pop Airplay.

== Music video ==
=== Production and synopsis ===
Swift as a showgirl in the music video for "The Fate of Ophelia", featuring the same dancers from the Eras Tour

Swift wrote and directed the music video for "The Fate of Ophelia", which features dancers from the Eras Tour. On the video, she worked with the choreographer Mandy Moore and the production designer Ethan Tobman, both of whom had collaborated on the tour, as well as the cinematographer Rodrigo Prieto. The music video is played twice during The Official Release Party of a Showgirl, which also features behind-the-scenes footage from the production process. Rehearsals took place within over three weeks, and filming for the opening scene and the dressing room scenes took place at the Los Angeles Theatre.

The music video opens inside the foyer of the Los Angeles Theatre before panning to a painting on the wall, the first of many depictions of various showgirls from different historical times. Swift starts as a model for a Pre-Raphaelite portrait of Ophelia, in a vein similar to the Ophelia, an Art Nouveau painting by Friedrich Heyser. Swift is then portrayed as a blonde burlesque performer in the style of Marilyn Monroe, a 1960s Ronnie Spector-like go-go dancer, a stage actress similar to Sarah Bernhardt, and an Esther Williams-type actress in a musical number in the style of Busby Berkeley.

Later, Swift wears a dress made of rope and resembles Elizabeth Taylor before the scene transitions to a Bob Mackie-style showgirl routine, and finally to a pop star at an afterparty in a hotel room. The video ends with Swift half-submerged in a bathtub, an image featured on the album cover for The Life of a Showgirl. The video features Easter eggs referencing other tracks from The Life of a Showgirl and moments from the Eras Tour, as well as Kelce. Vancouver's Science World makes a brief appearance near the end of the video.

=== Reception ===
The music video trended at the number one spot on YouTube, receiving 25 million views within three days. Journalists praised the spectacle and production value of the music video. Vogue called the video a "true visual feast", highlighting the costumes and detailed production design. Elle and The Times of India praised the nods to classical art and pop-cultural references. Rolling Stone highlighted how the video leans into theatrical imagery and costume transformations, emphasizing visual flair that matches The Life of a Showgirl theme. Deadline Hollywood commended Swift's direction and visual storytelling.

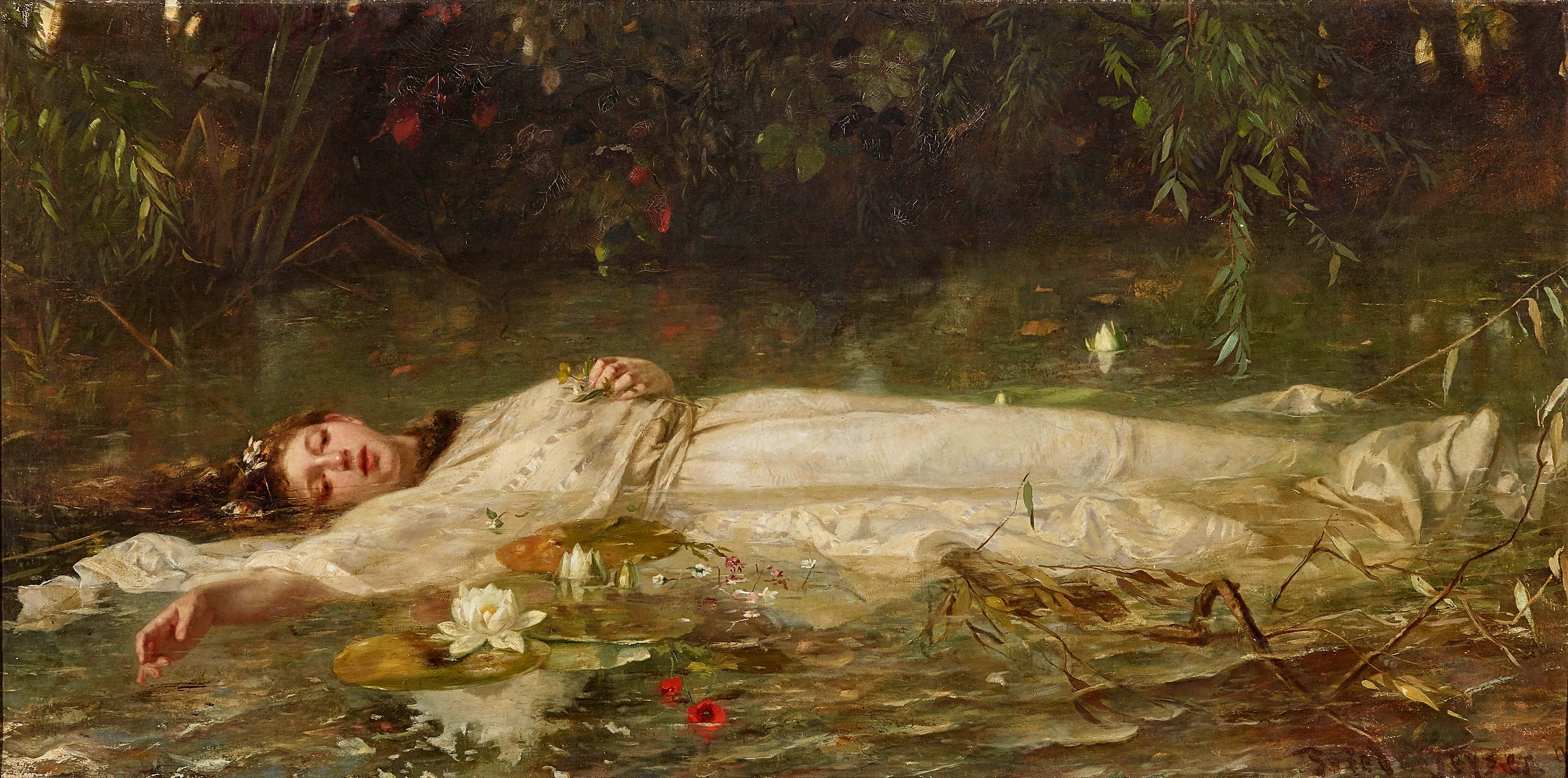
Fans visited the Museum Wiesbaden in Germany to view the c. 1900 painting Ophelia by Friedrich Heyser that inspired the music video.

The video caused Swift's fans, the Swifties, to visit the Museum Wiesbaden in Wiesbaden, Germany, to view Heyser's Ophelia. Timon Gremmels, the minister of science and research, arts and culture of the German state Hesse, expressed his delight over the attention the painting has received: "When a music video gets people to visit a museum, it shows that culture works – on all levels", and extended an official invitation to Swift to visit Wiesbaden. On November 2, 2025, the museum hosted an event featuring a guided tour of Ophelia, for which tickets sold out in a few hours. Attendees wearing outfits inspired by Swift or Ophelia received free admission. Parade reported a December 2025 study showing that the internet search for "Ophelia" peaked 1,231 percent above normal, while "Hamlet" experienced a 66 percent spike in interest.

The choreography created a viral trend on social media, where fans and creators imitated Swift's dance moves. Among those who attempted the choreography were the prime minister of Australia, Anthony Albanese, on the Melbourne radio station Nova 100, and the Indian parliamentarian and author Shashi Tharoor.

== Live performance ==
On October 17, 2026, Swift performed "The Fate of Ophelia" as part of a four-song closing set at the Academy Museum Gala, an annual fundraiser for the Academy Museum of Motion Pictures. It was the first time she performed the song live.

== Accolades ==
Accolades received by "The Fate of Ophelia"
Organization	Year (Note: Indicates the year of ceremony. Each year is linked to the article about the awards held that year, wherever possible.)	Category	Result	Ref(s).
ADG Excellence in Production Design Awards	2026	Excellence in Production Design for a Music Video or Webseries	Nominated	
AICP Awards	2026	AICP Show – Music Video	Nominated	
AICP Awards	2026	AICP Post – Music Video	Nominated	
AICP Awards	2026	AICP Post – Color Grading for Music Video	Nominated	
American Music Awards	2026	Song of the Year	Nominated	
American Music Awards	2026	Best Pop Song	Nominated	
American Music Awards	2026	Best Music Video	Nominated	
American Society of Cinematographers Awards	2026	Outstanding Achievement in Cinematography in Music Video	Won	
ASCAP Pop Music Awards	2026	Winning Songs	Won	
Berlin Commercial Awards	2026	Craft: Color Grading	Shortlisted	
BreakTudo Awards	2026	International Hit of the Year	Pending	
Brit Awards	2026	International Song of the Year	Nominated	
Grammy Awards	2027	Record of the Year	Pending	
iHeartRadio Music Awards	2026	Song of the Year	Nominated	
iHeartRadio Music Awards	2026	Pop Song of the Year	Won	
iHeartRadio Music Awards	2026	Best Music Video	Won	
iHeartRadio Music Awards	2026	Best Lyrics	Won	
iHeartRadio Music Awards	2026	Favorite TikTok Dance	Nominated	
Los 40 Music Awards	2026	Best International Song	Nominated	
MTV Video Music Awards	2026	Video of the Year	Won	
MTV Video Music Awards	2026	Best Pop	Nominated	
MTV Video Music Awards	2026	Best Art Direction	Nominated	
MTV Video Music Awards	2026	Best Cinematography	Nominated	
MTV Video Music Awards	2026	Best Editing	Nominated	
MTV Video Music Awards	2026	Best Choreography	Nominated	
MTV Video Music Awards	2026	Best Visual Effects	Nominated	
MTV Video Music Awards Japan	2026	Best Solo Artist Video – International	Won	
Music Awards Japan	2026	Best International Pop Song in Japan	Nominated	
Music Awards Japan	2026	Best of Listeners' Choice: International Song	Nominated	
Musikförläggarnas Pris	2026	Song of the Year	Nominated	
Musikförläggarnas Pris	2026	Listeners' Award (presented by Spotify)	Won	
NetEase Annual Music Awards	2026	English Single of the Year	Won	
Nickelodeon Kids' Choice Awards	2026	Favorite Song	Nominated	
NRJ Music Awards	2026	International Hit of the Year	Nominated	

== In popular culture ==
Journalists described the release and success of "The Fate of Ophelia" as a cultural phenomenon. Sunil Thomas of The Week opined that the "unprecedented" global phenomenon was spurred by its "high art" references, inspiration from 1960s stage productions, and its adult contemporary musical composition. He also highlighted its viral dance on Instagram, YouTube, and TikTok.

The October 18, 2025, episode of the American late-night show Saturday Night Live included a sketch featuring a parody of "The Fate of Ophelia", performed by the American singer Sabrina Carpenter, actress Chloe Fineman, and comedians Marcello Hernández and Andrew Dismukes. The November 8 episode of the British dance contest show Strictly Come Dancing series 23 featured a tango performance by the British television personality Vicky Pattison and choreographer Kai Widdrington to "The Fate of Ophelia".

The song featured on social media posts by NATO and the British royal family. On November 4, 2025, the official White House TikTok account posted a patriotic video of the U.S. president Donald Trump's administration with "The Fate of Ophelia", featuring images of the US flag and military, despite Trump's anti-Swift stance. Responding to Variety's request for comment, a White House official said: "We made this video because we knew fake news media brands like Variety would breathlessly amplify them. Congrats, you got played." The video received backlash from social media users and Swifties.

In December 2025, AI-generated songs featuring a translated version of "The Fate of Ophelia" in the Portuguese language, named "A Sina de Ofélia", with voices resembling a duet by Luísa Sonza and Dilsinho, went viral. It entered the top 50 of Spotify's Brazilian chart before being removed from streaming platforms. This brought some legal debates about music generated by artificial intelligence and ownership rights. Under the title "Todo Tempo Sozinha Nessa Torre", it peaked at number 85 on the Brasil Hot 100.

== Personnel ==
Credits adapted from the liner notes of The Life of a Showgirl

Studios

- Produced at MXM Studios and Shellback Studios, Stockholm
- Recorded at Shellback Studios, Stockholm
- Mixed at MixStar Studios, Virginia Beach
- Mastered at Sterling Sound, Edgewater, New Jersey

Personnel

- Taylor Swift – lead vocals, songwriting, production
- Max Martin – production, songwriting, programming, keyboards, piano, recording
- Shellback – production, songwriting, programming, bass, drums, guitar, keyboards, Omnichord, percussion, recording
- Anders Pettersson – pedal steel guitar
- Lasse Mårtén – recording, engineering
- Serban Ghenea – mixing
- Bryce Bordone – assistant mixing
- Randy Merrill – mastering

== Charts ==
=== Weekly charts ===
Weekly chart performance
Chart (2025–2026)	Peak position
Argentina (CAPIF)	3
Argentina Hot 100 (Billboard)	4
Australia (ARIA)	1
Austria (Ö3 Austria Top 40)	1
Austria Airplay (MusicTrace)	1
Belarus Airplay (TopHit)	11
Belgium (Ultratop 50 Flanders)	1
Belgium (Ultratop 50 Wallonia)	2
Bolivia Airplay (Monitor Latino)	2
Brazil Hot 100 (Billboard)	3
Bulgaria Airplay (PROPHON)	1
Canada Hot 100 (Billboard)	1
Canada AC (Billboard)	1
Canada CHR/Top 40 (Billboard)	1
Canada Hot AC (Billboard)	1
Central America Airplay (Monitor Latino)	14
Central America + Caribbean Airplay (BMAT)	8
Chile Airplay (Monitor Latino)	4
Colombia Hot 100 (Billboard)	58
CIS Airplay (TopHit)	1
Costa Rica Airplay (FONOTICA)	5
Costa Rica Streaming (FONOTICA)	5
Croatia (Billboard)	3
Czech Republic Airplay (ČNS IFPI)	1
Czech Republic Singles Digital (ČNS IFPI)	1
Denmark (Tracklisten)	1
Denmark Airplay (Tracklisten)	1
Dominican Republic Anglo Airplay (Monitor Latino)	1
Ecuador (Billboard)	16
El Salvador Airplay (ASAP EGC)	8
Estonia Airplay (TopHit)	1
Estonia Airplay (TopHit) Lord Luxury Remix	64
Finland (Suomen virallinen lista)	5
France (SNEP)	4
France Airplay (SNEP)	1
Germany (GfK)	1
Global 200 (Billboard)	1
Greece International (IFPI)	1
Guatemala Airplay (Monitor Latino)	15
Honduras Anglo Airplay (Monitor Latino)	1
Hong Kong (Billboard)	2
Hungary (Rádiós Top 40)	1
Hungary (Single Top 40)	4
Iceland (Tónlistinn)	1
India International (IMI)	1
Indonesia (IFPI)	12
Ireland (IRMA)	1
Israel (Mako Hitlist)	17
Italy (FIMI)	4
Kazakhstan Airplay (TopHit)	2
Jamaica Airplay (JAMMS)	10
Japan (Japan Hot 100)	19
Latin America Anglo Airplay (Monitor Latino)	1
Latvia Airplay (LaIPA)	1
Latvia Streaming (LaIPA)	1
Lebanon (Lebanese Top 20)	1
Lithuania (AGATA)	1
Lithuania Airplay (TopHit) Lord Luxury Remix	75
Luxembourg (Billboard)	1
Malaysia (IFPI)	1
Mexico Airplay (Monitor Latino)	11
Mexico Streaming (AMPROFON)	8
Middle East and North Africa (IFPI)	2
Moldova Airplay (TopHit)	42
Netherlands (Dutch Top 40)	1
Netherlands (Single Top 100)	1
New Zealand (Recorded Music NZ)	1
Nicaragua Anglo Airplay (Monitor Latino)	4
Nigeria (TurnTable Top 100)	32
Nigeria Airplay (TurnTable)	10
Norway (VG-lista)	1
Panama International (PRODUCE)	7
Paraguay Airplay (Monitor Latino)	1
Peru (Billboard)	9
Philippines Hot 100 (Billboard Philippines)	1
Poland Airplay (OLiS)	1
Poland Streaming (OLiS)	7
Portugal (AFP)	1
Puerto Rico Anglo Airplay (Monitor Latino)	1
Romania (Billboard)	18
Romania Airplay (UPFR)	8
Russia Airplay (TopHit)	3
Saudi Arabia (IFPI)	5
Singapore (RIAS)	1
Slovakia Airplay (ČNS IFPI)	1
Slovakia Singles Digital (ČNS IFPI)	2
South Africa Airplay (TOSAC)	3
South Africa Streaming (TOSAC)	8
South Korea (Circle)	134
Spain (Promusicae)	1
Spain Airplay (Promusicae)	1
Sweden (Sverigetopplistan)	1
Switzerland (Schweizer Hitparade)	1
Taiwan (Billboard)	5
Thailand (IFPI)	19
Turkey International Airplay (Radiomonitor Türkiye)	2
Ukraine Airplay (TopHit)	1
United Arab Emirates (IFPI)	1
Uruguay Airplay (Monitor Latino)	6
UK Singles (Official Charts)	1
UK Airplay (Radiomonitor)	1
US Billboard Hot 100	1
US Adult Contemporary (Billboard)	2
US Adult Pop Airplay (Billboard)	1
US Pop Airplay (Billboard)	1
US Rhythmic Airplay (Billboard)	40
Venezuela Airplay (Record Report)	13
Vietnam (IFPI)	1

=== Monthly charts ===
Monthly chart performance
Chart (2025–2026)	Peak position
Belarus Airplay (TopHit)	15
Brazil Streaming (Pro-Música Brasil)	19
CIS Airplay (TopHit)	1
Estonia Airplay (TopHit)	1
Estonia Airplay (TopHit) Loud Luxury Remix	78
Kazakhstan Airplay (TopHit)	4
Lithuania Airplay (TopHit)	2
Lithuania Airplay (TopHit) Loud Luxury Remix	88
Moldova Airplay (TopHit)	74
Panama Streaming (PRODUCE)	27
Paraguay Airplay (SGP)	6
Romania Airplay (TopHit)	12
Russia Airplay (TopHit)	4
South Korea (Circle)	200
Ukraine Airplay (TopHit)	4
Uruguay Streaming (CUD)	16

=== Year-end charts ===
Year-end chart performance
Chart (2025)	Position
Argentina Airplay (Monitor Latino)	75
Australia (ARIA)	27
Austria (Ö3 Austria Top 40)	18
Belgium (Ultratop 50 Flanders)	49
Belgium (Ultratop 50 Wallonia)	83
Canada AC (Billboard)	79
Canada Hot AC (Billboard)	95
CIS Airplay (TopHit)	90
Denmark (Tracklisten)	81
Estonia Airplay (TopHit)	19
France (SNEP)	106
Germany (GfK)	23
Hungary (Single Top 40)	99
Iceland (Tónlistinn)	86
Lithuania Airplay (TopHit)	57
Netherlands (Dutch Top 40)	34
Netherlands (Single Top 100)	39
New Zealand (Recorded Music NZ)	26
Norway (IFPI Norge)	25
Philippines (Philippines Hot 100)	84
Poland Airplay (OLiS)	44
Sweden (Sverigetopplistan)	66
Switzerland (Schweizer Hitparade)	26
UK Singles (OCC)	29

== Certifications ==
Certifications
Region	Certification	Certified units/sales
Australia (ARIA)	2× Platinum	140,000^{‡}
Austria (IFPI Austria)	Platinum	30,000^{‡}
Belgium (BRMA)	2× Platinum	80,000^{‡}
Brazil (Pro-Música Brasil)	3× Diamond	480,000^{‡}
Canada (Music Canada)	3× Platinum	240,000^{‡}
Denmark (IFPI Danmark)	Platinum	90,000^{‡}
France (SNEP)	Diamond	333,333^{‡}
Germany (BVMI)	Platinum	600,000^{‡}
Italy (FIMI)	Platinum	200,000^{‡}
New Zealand (RMNZ)	3× Platinum	90,000^{‡}
Poland (ZPAV)	2× Platinum	250,000^{‡}
Portugal (AFP)	4× Platinum	100,000^{‡}
Spain (Promusicae)	2× Platinum	200,000^{‡}
United Kingdom (BPI)	2× Platinum	1,200,000^{‡}
Streaming
Central America (CFC)	Platinum	7,000,000^{†}
Czech Republic (ČNS IFPI)	Platinum	5,000,000^{†}
Greece (IFPI Greece)	Platinum	2,000,000^{†}
Slovakia (ČNS IFPI)	Platinum	1,700,000^{†}
^{‡} Sales+streaming figures based on certification alone.^{†} Streaming-only figures based on certification alone.

== Release history ==
Release dates and formats
Region	Date	Format	Version	Label	Ref.
Various	October 3, 2025	Streaming	Original	Republic	
Italy	October 3, 2025	Radio airplay	Original	Universal	
United States	October 6, 2025	Hot adult contemporary radio	Original	Republic	
United States	October 7, 2025	Contemporary hit radio	Original	Republic	
Various	October 28, 2025	Digital download	Acoustic	Republic	
United States	October 30, 2025	CD single	Original; instrumental	Republic	
United States	October 30, 2025	CD single	Acoustic; acoustic instrumental	Republic	
Various	October 31, 2025	Streaming	Acoustic; original	Republic	
Various	October 31, 2025	Digital download	Original	Republic	
Various	October 31, 2025	Digital download	Instrumental	Republic	
Various	October 31, 2025	Digital download	Acoustic instrumental	Republic	
Various	November 6, 2025	Digital download; streaming	Loud Luxury remix	Republic	
Various	November 21, 2025	Digital download	Loud Luxury extended remix	Republic	
Various	November 25, 2025	Digital download	The Chainsmokers remix	Republic	
Various	November 28, 2025	Streaming	The Chainsmokers remix; original; acoustic	Republic	
Various	December 18, 2025	7-inch single	Original; acoustic	Republic	
Various	January 6, 2026	Digital download	The Chainsmokers extended remix	Republic	
Various	January 14, 2026	Digital download	Telykast & XanTz remix	Republic	
Various	January 15, 2026	Digital download	Telykast & XanTz extended remix	Republic	

== See also ==
- List of Billboard Hot 100 number ones of 2025
- List of Billboard Hot 100 number ones of 2026
- List of Canadian Hot 100 number-one singles of 2025
- List of Canadian Hot 100 number-one singles of 2026
- List of Dutch Top 40 number-one singles of 2025
- List of number-one hits of 2025 (Austria)
- List of number-one hits of 2025 (Denmark)
- List of number-one hits of 2025 (Switzerland)
- List of number-one singles and albums in Sweden
- List of number-one singles from the 2020s (New Zealand)
- List of number-one singles of the 2020s (Norway)
- List of number-one singles of 2025 (Australia)
- List of number-one singles of 2025 (Ireland)
- List of number-one singles of 2025 (Portugal)
- List of number-one singles of 2025 (Spain)
- List of UK singles chart number ones of the 2020s
- List of Ultratop 50 number-one singles of 2025
- List of Ultratop 50 number-one singles of 2026
- List of number-one hits of 2025 (Germany)
- List of number-one hits of 2026 (Germany)
