= Satanized (song) =

Single by Ghost

from the album Skeletá
- Released: March 5, 2025
- Genre: Hard rock; gothic rock
- Length: 3:57
- Label: Loma Vista
- Songwriters: A Ghoul Writer; Vincent Pontare; Salem al Fakir
- Producer: Gene Walker

Ghost singles chronology
"The Future Is a Foreign Land" (2024)	"Satanized" (2025)	"Lachryma" (2025)

"Satanized" is a song by the Swedish rock band Ghost. It was released on 5 March 2025 through Loma Vista Recordings as the lead single from their sixth studio album, Skeletá. The song was produced by the band's leader Tobias Forge under the pseudonym "Gene Walker" and debuted at number six on Billboard's Mainstream Rock Airplay chart.

== Background ==
On the day before the release of "Satanized", Ghost livestreamed a billboard in Las Vegas reading "V IS COMING", teasing the band's new frontman character, Papa V Perpetua, portrayed by lead vocalist Tobias Forge. The single was released at midnight (EST) along with a music video. In collaboration with Jason Zada, the band also launched a web app called "The Satanizer" that allows users to transform themselves into characters from the video.

== Themes and composition ==
"Satanized" blends rock and hard rock into an energetic, 1980s-inspired 6/8 rhythm, featuring driving guitars, punchy drums, layered harmonies, and catchy hooks that give the song anthemic appeal. Stephen Andrew Galiher of Vice described it as "a catchy goth-rock epic".

Lyrically, "Satanized" shifts from Ghost's typical devil-worship themes toward a more introspective reflection on the struggle between sin and salvation, with religious imagery centering on themes of blasphemy, heresy, and a desire for redemption.

== Music video ==
The music video, directed by Amir Chamdin and starring David Dencik, depicts a frustrated monk in a confessional while two nuns mock him. Around him, members of the clergy, possibly portrayed by the unmasked members of Ghost, play cheerfully. At the end of the video, without the support of his church, the monk transforms into the band's frontman character, Papa V Perpetua, revealing the group's new look, with Perpetua wearing purple and silver makeup and attire. Additionally, Tobias Forge's new mask covers only half of his face, whereas previous masks were full-head prosthetics.

== Reception ==
"Satanized" received generally positive reviews from music critics. Reviewers praised its energetic instrumentation, 1980s-inspired hard rock sound, and anthemic chorus. The Rockpit highlighted the track's "catchy hooks, layered harmonies, and dynamic guitar work", noting it as a strong lead single that showcases Ghost's signature theatrical style.

ACRN commented on the lyrical themes, describing the song as a "dramatic exploration of inner conflict framed with religious imagery", and praised the blend of melodically engaging hooks with darker, thematic content.

Critics also noted the song's music video and promotional web app as effective extensions of Ghost's theatrical presentation, emphasizing the band's flair for combining visual storytelling with musical releases.

== Weekly charts ==
Weekly chart performance for "Satanized"
Chart (2025)	Peak position
Canada Rock (Billboard)	32
US Mainstream Rock (Billboard)	6
Sweden (Sverigetopplistan)	78
US Hot Rock & Alternative Songs (Billboard)	32
US Rock & Alternative Airplay (Billboard)	18
