= List of Ultratop 50 number-one singles of 2025 =

These songs topped the Ultratop 50 in 2025.

Number-one singles of 2025 in Flanders
Flanders
Issue date	Song	Artist	Ref.
4 January	"That's So True"	Gracie Abrams	
11 January	"That's So True"	Gracie Abrams	
18 January	"That's So True"	Gracie Abrams	
25 January	"That's So True"	Gracie Abrams	
1 February	"APT."	Rosé and Bruno Mars	
8 February	"APT."	Rosé and Bruno Mars	
15 February	"Messy"	Lola Young	
22 February	"Messy"	Lola Young	
1 March	"Messy"	Lola Young	
8 March	"Messy"	Lola Young	
15 March	"Messy"	Lola Young	
22 March	"Messy"	Lola Young	
29 March	"Atlas"	Pommelien Thijs	
5 April	"Atlas"	Pommelien Thijs	
12 April	"Atlas"	Pommelien Thijs	
19 April	"Atlas"	Pommelien Thijs	
26 April	"Atlas"	Pommelien Thijs	
3 May	"Atlas"	Pommelien Thijs	
10 May	"Atlas"	Pommelien Thijs	
17 May	"Atlas"	Pommelien Thijs	
24 May	"Ordinary"	Alex Warren	
31 May	"Ordinary"	Alex Warren	
7 June	"Atlas"	Pommelien Thijs	
14 June	"Atlas"	Pommelien Thijs	
21 June	"Ordinary"	Alex Warren	
28 June	"Atlas"	Pommelien Thijs	
5 July	"Atlas"	Pommelien Thijs	
12 July	"Azizam"	Ed Sheeran	
19 July	"Atlas"	Pommelien Thijs	
26 July	"Atlas"	Pommelien Thijs	
2 August	"Atlas"	Pommelien Thijs	
9 August	"Atlas"	Pommelien Thijs	
16 August	"Atlas"	Pommelien Thijs	
23 August	"Atlas"	Pommelien Thijs	
30 August	"Atlas"	Pommelien Thijs	
6 September	"Atlas"	Pommelien Thijs	
13 September	"Atlas"	Pommelien Thijs	
20 September	"Atlas"	Pommelien Thijs	
27 September	"Man I Need"	Olivia Dean	
4 October	"Man I Need"	Olivia Dean	
11 October	"The Fate of Ophelia"	Taylor Swift	
18 October	"The Fate of Ophelia"	Taylor Swift	
25 October	"Man I Need"	Olivia Dean	
1 November	"Man I Need"	Olivia Dean	
8 November	"Man I Need"	Olivia Dean	
15 November	"Man I Need"	Olivia Dean	
22 November	"Man I Need"	Olivia Dean	
29 November	"The Fate of Ophelia"	Taylor Swift	
6 December	"The Fate of Ophelia"	Taylor Swift	
13 December	"Man I Need"	Olivia Dean	
20 December	"The Fate of Ophelia"	Taylor Swift	
27 December	"The Fate of Ophelia"	Taylor Swift	

Number-one singles of 2025 in Wallonia
Wallonia
Issue date	Song	Artist	Ref.
4 January	"Ma meilleure ennemie"	Stromae and Pomme	
11 January	"Ma meilleure ennemie"	Stromae and Pomme	
18 January	"Ma meilleure ennemie"	Stromae and Pomme	
25 January	"APT."	Rosé and Bruno Mars	
1 February	"APT."	Rosé and Bruno Mars	
8 February	"APT."	Rosé and Bruno Mars	
15 February	"APT."	Rosé and Bruno Mars	
22 February	"APT."	Rosé and Bruno Mars	
1 March	"Ciel"	Gims	
8 March	"Ciel"	Gims	
15 March	"Ciel"	Gims	
22 March	"Ciel"	Gims	
29 March	"Ciel"	Gims	
5 April	"Ciel"	Gims	
12 April	"Ciel"	Gims	
19 April	"Messy"	Lola Young	
26 April	"Ciel"	Gims	
3 May	"Ciel"	Gims	
10 May	"Ciel"	Gims	
17 May	"Ordinary"	Alex Warren	
24 May	"Kyky2bondy"	Hamza	
31 May	"Kyky2bondy"	Hamza	
7 June	"Impardonnable"	Damso	
14 June	"Impardonnable"	Damso	
21 June	"Ordinary"	Alex Warren	
28 June	"Kyky2bondy"	Hamza	
5 July	"Ordinary"	Alex Warren	
12 July	"Ordinary"	Alex Warren	
19 July	"Ordinary"	Alex Warren	
26 July	"Ordinary"	Alex Warren	
2 August	"Ordinary"	Alex Warren	
9 August	"Charger"	Triangle des Bermudes	
16 August	"Soleil bleu"	Bleu Soleil with Luiza	
23 August	"Soleil bleu"	Bleu Soleil with Luiza	
30 August	"Soleil bleu"	Bleu Soleil with Luiza	
6 September	"Soleil bleu"	Bleu Soleil with Luiza	
13 September	"Soleil bleu"	Bleu Soleil with Luiza	
20 September	"Soleil bleu"	Bleu Soleil with Luiza	
27 September	"Soleil bleu"	Bleu Soleil with Luiza	
4 October	"Soleil bleu"	Bleu Soleil with Luiza	
11 October	"Soleil bleu"	Bleu Soleil with Luiza	
18 October	"Soleil bleu"	Bleu Soleil with Luiza	
25 October	"Melodrama"	Disiz and Theodora	
1 November	"Melodrama"	Disiz and Theodora	
8 November	"Melodrama"	Disiz and Theodora	
15 November	"Melodrama"	Disiz and Theodora	
22 November	"Melodrama"	Disiz and Theodora	
29 November	"Melodrama"	Disiz and Theodora	
6 December	"Melodrama"	Disiz and Theodora	
13 December	"Melodrama"	Disiz and Theodora	
20 December	"Melodrama"	Disiz and Theodora	
27 December	"Melodrama"	Disiz and Theodora	

Flanders ranking of most weeks at number 1
Position	Artist	Weeks #1
1	Pommelien Thijs	22
2	Olivia Dean	8
3	Lola Young	6
3	Taylor Swift	6
4	Gracie Abrams	4
5	Alex Warren	3
6	Rosé	2
6	Bruno Mars	2
7	Ed Sheeran	1

Wallonia ranking of most weeks at number 1
Position	Artist	Weeks #1
1	Gims	10
1	Bleu Soleil	10
1	Luiza	10
1	Disiz	10
1	Theodora	10
2	Alex Warren	7
3	Rosé	5
3	Bruno Mars	5
4	Stromae	3
4	Pomme	3
4	Hamza	3
5	Damso	2
6	Lola Young	1
6	Triangle des Bermudes	1

== See also ==
- List of number-one albums of 2025 (Belgium)
- 2025 in music
