= Akon (song) =

2025 single by Jazeek

Single by Jazeek

from the album Most Valuable Playa
- Language: German
- Released: 28 March 2025
- Genre: Contemporary R&B; German hip-hop
- Length: 2:18
- Label: Ninetynie Music
- Songwriters: Jules Kalmbacher; Manuel Mayer; Jacek Savic; Jens Schneider
- Producers: Jules Kalmbacher; Manuel Mayer; Jens Schneider

Jazeek singles chronology
"Crazyyy" (2025)	"Akon" (2025)	"Nur du" (2025)

Music video
- "Akon" on YouTube

"Akon" is a song co-written and performed by German rapper Jazeek. The song was released on 28 March 2026 through Ninetynie Music, as part of his third studio album, Most Valuable Playa, becoming a number-one hit in Germany before it was released as a single the following month.

== Background and composition ==
"Akon" was written by Jacek Savic (Jazeek), Jules Kalmbacher, Manuel Mayer (Manju), and Jens Schneider, all of whom were responsible for the composition. The lyric were written by Jazeek. Additionally, Kalmacher, Meyer and Schneider were responsible for the production.

"Akon" was initially released on 28 March 2025, by Ninetynie Music, as part of Jazeek's third studio album, Most Valuable Playa. It was released as a digital 2-track single on 8 April 2025, as the tenth single from the album, which contains the album version and "Afro House Remix". Three days later, a remix by Niklas Dee was released as a digital single.

== Lyrics ==
"Akon" is a song characterized by a lively party atmosphere. The lyrics describe an exciting night full of music, dancing and passion. Jazeek raps about a woman who appreciates his lifestyle and music, comparing the atmosphere of the night to the heat of Los Angeles and San Diego. The song's title pays tribute to the Senaglese-American singer and rapper Akon. Musically, "Akon" is characterized by catchy beat, auto-tune effects and a blend of modern R&B and trap elements.

== Music video ==
The music video for "Akon" was directed by Lucca Mille and debuted on 2 April 2025, on the online video platform YouTube, It features Jazeek in a glamorous club atmosphere, accompanied by dancing women and an energetic party scene. The video underscores the song's theme and was praised by fans for its high-quality production. By August 2025, the video had reached over 11 million views on YouTube.

== Commercial performance ==
"Akon" debuted on the German singles chart at number one on 11 April 2025, the week of the single's release, becoming Jazeek's first number-one hit of his career. For songwriters Kalbacher and Schneider, it is their second number-one hit after Twenty4tim's "I Don't Care" in February 2024. It also reached number one on the German-language singles charts. Additionally, it reached the top 10 on the Austrian and Swiss charts, reaching number four in both of them.

== Charts ==
=== Weekly charts ===
Weekly chart performance for "Akon"
Chart (2025)	Peak position
Austria (Ö3 Austria Top 40)	4
Germany (GfK)	1
Switzerland (Schweizer Hitparade)	4

=== Year-end charts ===
Year-end chart performance for "Akon"
Chart (2025)	Position
Austria (Ö3 Austria Top 40)	9
Germany (GfK)	7

== Certifications ==
Region	Certification	Certified units/sales
Germany (BVMI)	Gold	300,000^{‡}
^{‡} Sales+streaming figures based on certification alone.
