= Akon International Airport =

Planned airport in Warrap State, South Sudan

Coordinates: 8°53′14″N 27°56′30″E

Akon International Airport (IATA: AEE) is planned airport in the Akon Village of Gogrial West County, Warrap State, South Sudan.

== History ==
On July 25, 2022, Warrap State Governor Aleu Ayieny Aleu petitioned to the national government to support the construction of the $15 million Akon International Airport. Construction on the airport began on August 28, 2023, with the project to be completed within two years.

Wunkoc Engineering Company of Juba was awarded a contract to carry out the project, but the work was halted in 2025 after an investigation found the quality of work to be substandard.
