= Nico Santos =

Nico Santos may refer to:

- Nico Santos (actor) (born 1979), Filipino-American actor
- Nico Santos (singer) (born 1993), German-Spanish singer, songwriter, producer
- Niccolo "Nico" Santos, a character in the Philippine romantic fantasy drama television series Written in Our Stars
