= Zartmann =

German singer rapper, and songwriter

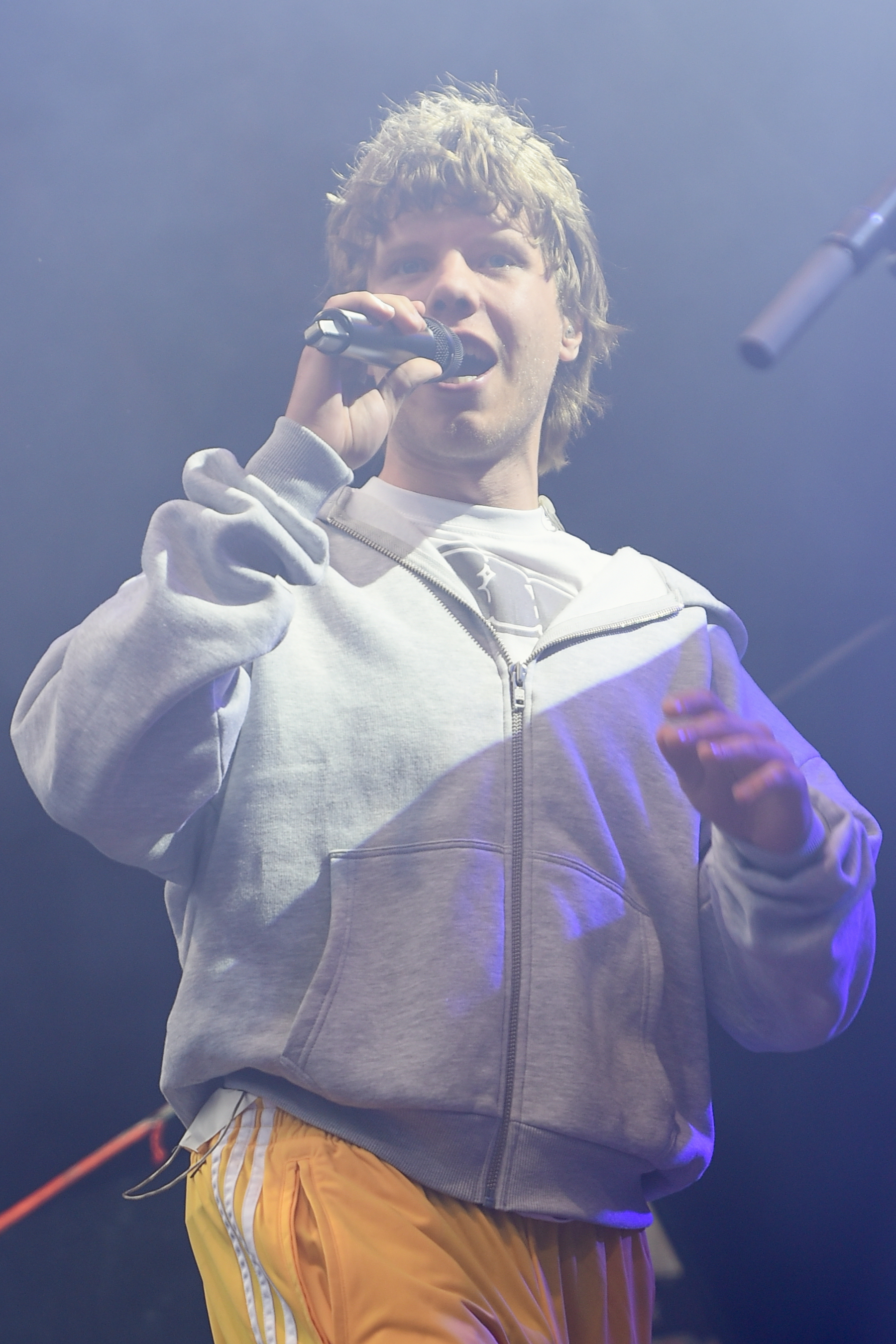
- Zartmann in 2024

Background information
- Born: Berlin, Germany
- Genres: Pop; hip-hop
- Occupations: Singer; rapper; songwriter

Zartmann is a German singer, rapper, and songwriter.

== Musical career ==
Zartmann attended school in Alt-Hohenschönhausen. He played his first songs on the guitar and recorded them with a producer who also became his manager. Musically, he oscillates between rap and pop. The first hype arose with the song "2 Blocks." This was followed by the EP "11 bis 2," which was released on 10 February 2022. Shortly thereafter, he broke up with his manager. Zartmann was stuck in an unfavorable contract for over a year and was unable to release any new songs, which he made public in a TikTok message. In retrospect, the artist explained that his ignorance had been exploited. In April 2023, he returned with the song "Ein Anruf entfernt", which he was able to release with the help of German band 01099 member Zachi. Since Zartmann could not finance a lawyer, Zachi paid for one himself. he then signed a contract with a label owned by Sony Music and has been publishing a considerable number of songs, resulting in his musical breakthrough in 2025 and being featured on the cover of spotify's German 2025 in music playlist as a part of its Wrapped-campaign.

In 2024, Zartmann performed as the opening act for 01099 and released the song "Zu stolz." With "Wie du manchmal fehlst," he reached number six in the German charts together with Ski Aggu and won the 1Live Krone for Best Alternative Song in 2024. The song "Tau mich auf" reached number 1 in the German singles charts in February 2025. Zartmanns 2026 Tour was almost fully sold out by January of the same year and will end in the Max-Schmeling-Halle, where performing has been a childhood dream of the artist.

== Musical style ==
Musically, Zartmann blends pop vocals with rap. Although some people think he writes German Indie Music. His songs are mostly emotional and melancholic.

== Personal life ==
Zartmann grew up in Prenzlauer Berg, a part of Berlin, in an, according to him, left-leaning household, but went to school in Altenschönhausen. The Schönhauser Allee is located there, after which he named his 2025 EP Schönhauser. He is the grandson of the German actor Jürgen Zartmann and has said his birthday is on the 19th of October. Zartmann has said that he took the ADHD medication Ritalin throughout his youth, inspiring his song of the same name in 2022 but immediately stopped taking it as soon as he finished school, saying that he knew he would not need it any further.

== Discography ==
=== Studio albums ===
List of studio albums, with selected chart positions
Title	Details	Peak chart positions		
Title	Details	GER	AUT	SWI
11 bis 2	Released: 10 February 2022; Label: Walk This Way (UMG); Format: CD, LP, digital download, streaming	—	—	—
Dafür bin ich frei	Released: 21 June 2024; Label: Bamboo Artists, Epic (Sony); Format: CD, LP, digital download, streaming	6	29	39
Schönhauser	Released: 4 April 2025; Label: Bamboo Artists, Epic (Sony); Format: CD, LP, digital download, streaming	1	1	1
"—" denotes a title that did not chart, or was not released in that territory.

=== EPs ===
List of EPs, with selected chart positions
Title	Details	Peak chart positions		
Title	Details	GER	AUT	SWI
Schönhauser	Released: 4 April 2025; Label: Bamboo Artists, Epic (Sony); Format: CD, LP, digital download, streaming	1	1	1

=== Singles ===
List of singles, with selected chart positions, sales and certifications
Title	Details	Peak chart positions			Certifications	Album
Title	Details	GER	AUT	SWI	Certifications	Album
"2 Blocks"	2021	—	—	—		Non-album singles
"Schon witzig"	2021	—	—	—		Non-album singles
"Komm mit an die Bar"	2021	—	—	—		Non-album singles
"Ich kann nicht mehr" (with Theo Junior)	2021	—	—	—		Non-album singles
"2 Blocks"	2023	—	—	—		Non-album singles
"Schon witzig" (with Bruckner)	2023	—	—	—		Non-album singles
"Komm mit an die Bar"	2023	—	—	—		Non-album singles
"Ich kann nicht mehr" (with Drumla & *Maliiik)	2023	—	—	—		Non-album singles
"Nichts für immer"	2024	—	—	—		Dafür bin ich frei
"Zu stolz" (with Drumla)	2024	—	—	—		Non-album single
"Fuß baumeln" (feat. Drumla)	2024	—	—	—		Dafür bin ich frei
"Meinen die uns" (feat. Aaron, Antonius & Kasi)	2024	—	—	—		Dafür bin ich frei
"Wie du manchmal fehlst" (feat. Ski Aggu)	2024	6	13	31	BVMI: Gold; IFPI AUT: Gold	Dafür bin ich frei
"Und du suchst noch überall, alles was mal von mir war"	2024	—	—	—		Dafür bin ich frei
"Dafür bin ich frei" (feat. Bausa)	2024	63	—	—		Dafür bin ich frei
"Wir haben’s überlebt"	2024	—	—	—		Non-album singles
"Niemand"	2024	—	—	—		Non-album singles
"Tau mich auf"	2025	1	2	7		Schönhauser
"Lass es gehen"	2025	37	—	—		Schönhauser
"Wunderschön"	2025	27	54	89		Schönhauser
"—" denotes a title that did not chart, or was not released in that territory.
