= Melissa Naschenweng =

Austrian musician and schlager singer (born 1990)

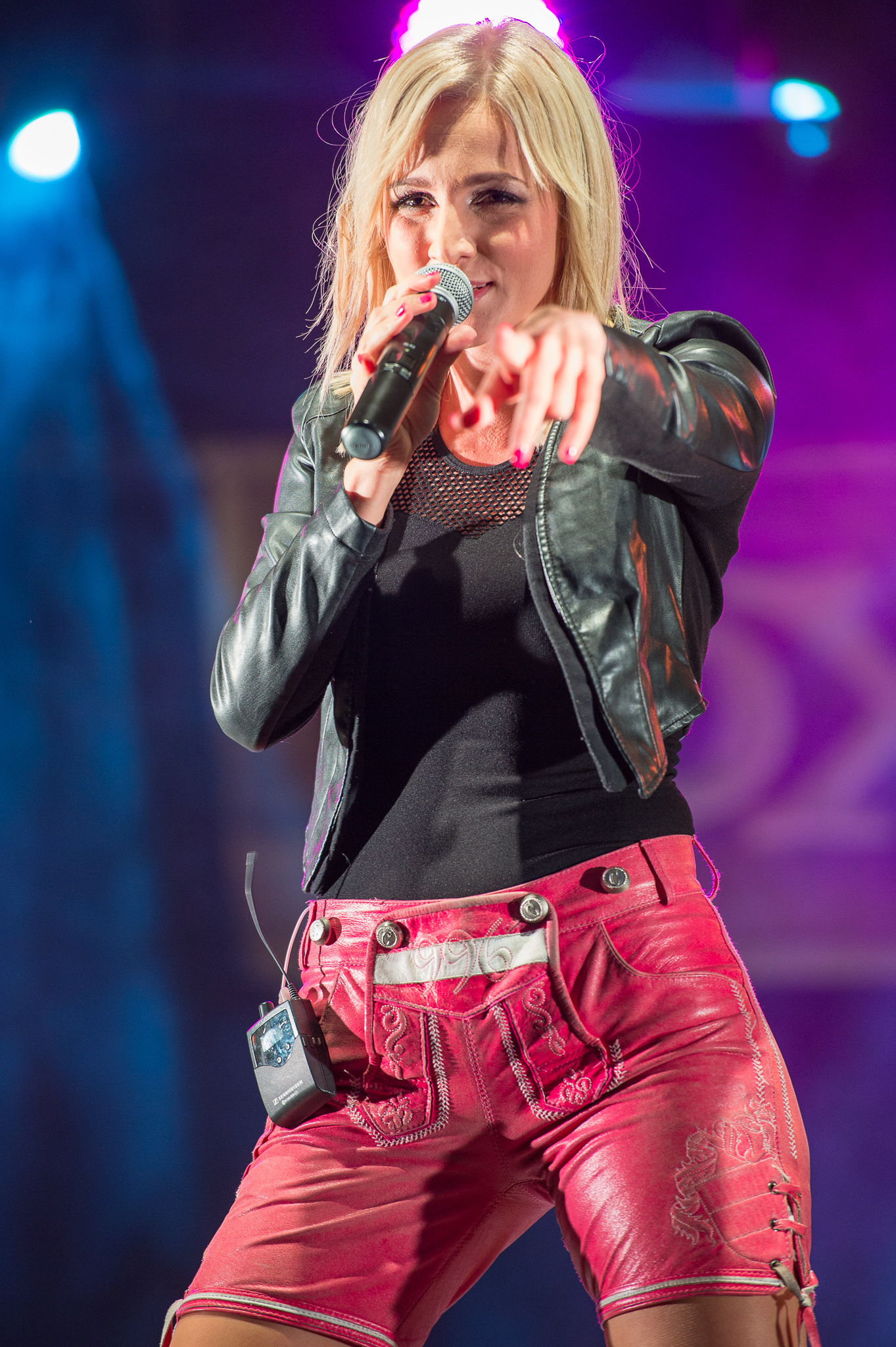
- Naschenweng in 2016

Background information
- Born: 11 July 1990 (age 36); Villach
- Genres: volksmusik, schlager
- Website: melissa-naschenweng.at

Melissa Naschenweng (born 11 July 1990) is an Austrian musician and schlager singer.

== Discography ==
=== Studio albums ===
| Title | Album details | Charts | | | Certifications |
| Title | Album details | AUT | GER | SWI | Certifications |
|---|---|---|---|---|---|
| Oanfoch schen, oanfoch du | Released: 2012; Label: Up-To Date | — | — | — | |
| Gänsehautgefühl | Released: 2014; Label: Telamo | — | — | — | |
| Kunterbunt | Released: 2017; Label: Ariola (Sony) | 3 | — | 46 | IFPI AUT: Platinum |
| Wirbelwind | Released: 11 January 2019; Label: Ariola (Sony) | 1 | 61 | 4 | IFPI AUT: 2× Platinum |
| LederHosenRock | Released: 30 October 2020; Label: Ariola (Sony) | 1 | 27 | 5 | IFPI AUT: Platinum |
| Glück | Released: 30 September 2022; Label: Ariola (Sony) | 1 | 19 | 4 | IFPI AUT: Platinum |
| Alpenbarbie | Released: 10 January 2025; Label: Ariola (Sony) | 1 | 8 | 2 | |

=== Compilations ===
| Title | Album details | Charts | |
| Title | Album details | AUT | SWI |
|---|---|---|---|
| Das Beste | Released: 2017; Label: Telamo | — | — |
| Das Beste | Released: 19 April 2019; Label: Telamonte | 27 | 67 |

=== Singles ===
- 2015: Federleicht
- 2016: Die ganze Nacht
- 2017: Braungebrannte Haut
