= Wackelkontakt =

2024 single by Oimara

Single by Oimara
- Language: Bavarian
- Released: 2 August 2024
- Genre: Partyschlager
- Length: 2:48
- Label: Stereopol; Virgin; Zeitgeist
- Songwriters: Andreas Frei; Beni Hafner; Niklas Nubel; Matthias Riegler
- Producer: Andreas Frei

Oimara singles chronology
"Onomatopoesie" (2024)	"Wackelkontakt" (2024)	"Es duad ma leid Mama" (2024)

Music video
- "Wackelkontakt" on YouTube

"Wackelkontakt" is a song by German singer-songwriter Oimara. It was written by Oimara himself alongside Andreas Frei, Niklas Nubel, and Matthias Riegler and produced by Frei. The song was released on 2 August 2024.

== Background and composition ==
Both the composition and the Bavarian lyrics were written by the artist Beni Hafner (Oimara) himself, along with co-writers Andreas Frei, Niklas Nubel, and Matthias Riegler. Frei was also responsible for production. The idea for the song came to Oimara while visiting a furniture store.

"Wackelkontakt" was first released as a single on 2 August 2024. It was released as a digital single track for download and streaming on the music labels Stereopol Records, Virgin Records, and Zeitgeist Records. On 21 February 2025, a remix by HBz and Luca-Dante Spadafora was released as a digital single track. A week later, another remix by Harris & Ford was released.

The song was featured in a prime-time live performance on the Giovanni Zarrella Show.

== Music video ==
The accompanying music video was directed by Marcel Chylla and premiered on the video platform YouTube on 15 February 2025. By March 2025, it had received over four million views.

== Commercial performance ==
"Wackelkontakt" entered the German singles charts at number 34 on 24 January 2025, reached the top of the chart three weeks later, and stayed there for seven weeks. It is the first number-one hit in Bavarian in almost 44 years; the last to achieve this was the Spider Murphy Gang with Skandal im Sperrbezirk on 5 April 1982. The song also reached number one in the German-language singles charts, topped the Breakthrough Artist Charts in February 2025, and on 7 March 2025, at number 15 on the New Entry Airplay Chart, and in the same chart week at number 52 on the Airplay Chart.

"Wackelkontakt" also became a number-one hit in Austria and Switzerland. On the streaming platform Spotify, the song had more than 53 million streams by March 2025. The song had over 16 million streams in Germany within one week, making it the most streamed domestic song within a week of all time; only "All I Want for Christmas Is You" and "Last Christmas" were able to record more streams within a chart week.

== Charts ==
=== Weekly charts ===
Weekly chart performance for "Wackelkontakt"
Chart (2025)	Peak position
Austria (Ö3 Austria Top 40)	1
Germany (GfK)	1
Global 200 (Billboard)	54
Netherlands (Dutch Top 40)	16
Netherlands (Single Top 100)	4
Switzerland (Schweizer Hitparade)	1

=== Year-end charts ===
Year-end chart performance for "Wackelkontakt"
Chart (2025)	Position
Austria (Ö3 Austria Top 40)	1
Germany (GfK)	1
Netherlands (Dutch Top 40)	83
Netherlands (Single Top 100)	79
Switzerland (Schweizer Hitparade)	33

== Certifications ==
Region	Certification	Certified units/sales
Germany (BVMI)	Gold	300,000^{‡}
^{‡} Sales+streaming figures based on certification alone.
