= Jazeek =

German rapper and songwriter

- Born: Jazeek Obren Savic; 17 September 2002 (age 23); Aachen, Germany
- Genres: Contemporary R&B; German hip-hop
- Occupations: Rapper; songwriter
- Years active: 2021-present

Jazeek Obren Savic (born 17 September 2002), known professionally as Jazeek, is a German rapper and songwriter.

== Early life ==
Jazeek was born in Aachen with American roots.

== Musical career ==
In 2021, Jazeek released a song on TikTok called "Blunt für dich," which samples "Stadt" by Cassandra Steen and Adel Tawil in the chorus. The track made him famous and reached 2.6 million views and 350,000 likes shortly after its release. He was signed to Universal Music. The song subsequently reached number 45 in the German charts. In 2022, he released the mixtape "1709," which contained a mix of R&B, rap, pop, dancehall, and Afrobeat. The mixtape reached number 95 in the German album charts. In 2023, his debut album, "One Hit Wonder," followed, which also reached the German charts and received a nomination for Best National Album at the Hiphop.de Awards 2023. Further singles were released in the same year. He achieved his highest ranking with "Bend Over," a remix of his first mixtape with rapper Reezy. In the same year, he performed at the Heroes Festival in Freiburg.

On January 16 2026, He released song ''Miami'' with reezy.

== Discography ==
=== Studio albums ===
List of studio albums, with selected chart positions
Title	Details	Peak chart positions		
Title	Details	GER	AUT	SWI
One Hit Wonder	Released: 2 June 2023; Label: Ninetynine Music / Good Kid Records / Ventura Records; Format: CD, LP, digital download, streaming	51	—	56
Ninetynine	Released: 12 January 2024; Label: Ninetynine Music / Good Kid Records / Ventura Records; Format: CD, LP, digital download, streaming	1	7	2
Most Valuable Playa	Released: 28 March 2025; Label: Ninetynine Music / Good Kid Records / Ventura Records; Format: CD, LP, digital download, streaming	1	2	1
4Lap	Released: 9 April 2026; Label: Ninetynine Music / Good Kid Records / Ventura Records; Format: CD, LP, digital download, streaming	1	3	2
"—" denotes a title that did not chart, or was not released in that territory.

=== Mixtapes ===
List of mixtapes, with selected chart positions
Title	Details	Peak chart positions
Title	Details	GER
Schönhauser	Released: 9 December 2022; Label: Ninetynine Music / Good Kid Records / Ventura Records; Format: CD, LP, digital download, streaming	95
