= Skeletá =

Studio album by Ghost
- Released: 25 April 2025
- Genres: Hard rock; arena rock; pop rock; glam metal
- Length: 46:43
- Label: Loma Vista
- Producer: Gene Walker

Ghost chronology
13 Commandments (2023)	Skeletá (2025)

Singles from Skeletá
- 1. "Satanized" Released: 5 March 2025; 2. "Lachryma" Released: 11 April 2025; 3. "Peacefield" Released: 22 April 2025; 4. "Umbra" Released: 13 February 2026

Skeletá is the sixth studio album by the Swedish rock band Ghost. It was released on 25 April 2025 through Loma Vista Recordings, was preceded by the singles "Satanized", "Lachryma" and "Peacefield", and is notable for being the band's first album to top the US Billboard 200. The album was produced by the band's leader Tobias Forge under the alias "Gene Walker".

== Release ==
Skeletá follows up the band's 2022 studio album Impera and is described as their "most unflinchingly introspective work to date". It was reported to include lyricism of "the newly instated Perpetua" and showcase a variety of "distinct individual emotional vistas". The band announced the album alongside the release of the lead single "Satanized" on 5 March 2025. Accompanying visuals were developed by the band alongside Jason Zada and enables fans to be integrated into the video. The album's second single, "Lachryma", was released on 11 April 2025. The album's third single, "Peacefield", was released on 22 April 2025. The fourth and final single "Umbra" was released on 14 February 2026.

Alongside the album announcement, the band revealed the new figurehead for the band called Papa V Perpetua. His vocal debut on the lead single "Satanized" was said to concern "demonic possessions" and succumbing to "dark forces".

== Composition and themes ==
Musically, the album has been described as hard rock, arena rock, pop rock, and glam metal. The album has been described as Ghost's most introspective album. Speaking about the album's themes, Sydney Taylor of Loudwire wrote, "It's a constant reckoning with guilt, identity, faith and failure."

== Promotion ==
In promotion of the album, the band embarked on the Skeletour, consisting of 73 dates starting at the AO Arena in Manchester on 15 April 2025 until February 2026. The tour encompassed dates in the United States, Europe, and Mexico and celebrated their "most spectacular live productions" as well as the "most ambitious run of their career".

Somewhat controversially, the band decided not to allow mobile phones in the venues for the tour. This led to a massive accumulation of attendees ahead of their show in Birmingham, England, as staff searched bags for phones.

== Commercial performance ==
Skeletá debuted on top of the US Billboard 200, shifting 86,000 album-equivalent units in its first week, with the album selling 77,000 copies. Skeletá marks the second time a performing Swedish artist reached the top of the Billboard 200, following Ace of Base's The Sign in 1993.

== Reception ==
Professional ratings
Aggregate scores
Source	Rating
AnyDecentMusic?	6.4/10
Metacritic	78/100
Review scores
Source	Rating
AllMusic	4/5 stars
Blabbermouth.net	8/10
Classic Rock	4/5 stars
Dork	4/5
The Irish Times	2/5 stars
Kerrang!	4/5
NME	4/5 stars
Paste	8/10
Slant Magazine	2.5/5 stars
Sputnikmusic	4/5

On Metacritic, a review aggregator site that compiles reviews from mainstream publications and assigns a weighted average score out of 100, Skeletá received a score of 78 based on ten critic reviews. This score indicated "generally favorable reviews". James Christopher Monger of AllMusic wrote, "There are bands that lavish in the fondue of modern hard rock without the cheese, but not Ghost. Ghost is fun." Dom Lawson of Blabbermouth.net called it "aggressively entertaining and full of massive tunes". Steven Loftin writing for Dork stated, "Skeleta continues to prove why Tobias and co are not only mainstays but so beloved."

Kelly Scanlon of Ed Power of The Irish Times was also mixed stating, "Ghost have always spun the cheesiest ingredients into pop gold. But this hollowed-out affair is haunted by the spirits of old glories." Sam Law of Kerrang! called it "Ghost's deepest, most intriguing statement to date." Liberty Dunworth of NME wrote, "Through a rich exploration of genres and a new level of emotional depth, it becomes clear that Skeletá was made with a new vision in mind, and comes as the promising start of a new Ghost chapter."

== Track listing ==
All tracks are written by Tobias Forge, with additional contributors noted.

Skeletá track listing
No.	Title	Writer(s)	Producer(s)	Length
1.	"Peacefield"	Salem Al Fakir; Vincent Pontare	Gene Walker; Salem Al Fakir; Vincent Pontare	5:40
2.	"Lachryma"	Max Grahn	Walker; Grahn	4:36
3.	"Satanized"	Al Fakir; Pontare	Walker; Al Fakir; Pontare	3:56
4.	"Guiding Lights"	Grahn	Walker; Grahn	3:24
5.	"De Profundis Borealis"	Grahn	Walker; Grahn	4:32
6.	"Cenotaph"	Grahn	Walker; Grahn	4:17
7.	"Missilia Amori"		Walker; Pontare	4:31
8.	"Marks of the Evil One"		Walker; Pontare	4:15
9.	"Umbra"	Grahn	Walker; Grahn	5:31
10.	"Excelsis"	Grahn	Walker; Grahn	6:01
Total length:				46:43

== Personnel ==
Ghost

- Tobias Forge (Papa V Perpetua) – vocals, bass (all tracks)
- A Group of Nameless Ghouls

Additional

- Fredrik Åkesson – lead guitar (tracks 1–3, 6–9)
- Salem Al Fakir – keyboards
- Martin Sandmark Eriksson – rhythm guitar, additional instruments
- Max Grahn – drums, additional instruments
- Vincent Pontare – additional synths
- Tove Burman – vocals (tracks 1, 3)
- Anthony Nichols – choir
- Per Larsson – choir
- Olle Vidner – choir
- Liv Howell – choir
- Joel Eberhardsson – choir
- Kristoffer Brander – choir
- Glädje Kalle Olsson – choir
- Jakob Grubbström – choir
- Emilia Hildebrand – choir
- Julia Fridberger – choir
- Katrin Jocham – choir
- Love Kihl – choir
- Rebecka Brostedt – choir
- Celina Larsson – choir
- Freja Högemark – choir
- Elisa Hedin – choir
- Emilia Karlborg – choir
- Susanna Appelgren – choir
- Martin Classon – choir
- Erik Uhlin – choir
- August Goldhahn – choir

Technical

- Max Grahn – producer
- Gene Walker – producer
- Martin Sandmark Eriksson – producer
- Vincent Pontare – producer
- Salem Al Fakir – producer
- Mark Rankin – engineer
- Niclas Lindström – engineer
- Basma Jabbar – engineer
- Wille Enblad – engineer
- Martin Sandmark Eriksson – engineer
- Calle London Gustavsson – engineer
- Andy Wallace – mixing
- Dan Malsch – mixing
- Ted Jensen – mastering

== Charts ==
=== Weekly charts ===
Weekly chart performance for Skeletá
Chart (2025)	Peak position
Australian Albums (ARIA)	1
Austrian Albums (Ö3 Austria)	1
Belgian Albums (Ultratop Flanders)	1
Belgian Albums (Ultratop Wallonia)	2
Canadian Albums (Billboard)	2
Croatian International Albums (HDU)	8
Danish Albums (Hitlisten)	23
Dutch Albums (Album Top 100)	2
Finnish Albums (Suomen virallinen lista)	1
French Albums (SNEP)	4
French Rock & Metal Albums (SNEP)	1
German Albums (Offizielle Top 100)	1
German Rock & Metal Albums (Offizielle Top 100)	1
Greek Albums (IFPI)	1
Hungarian Albums (MAHASZ)	31
Icelandic Albums (Tónlistinn)	31
Irish Albums (IRMA)	6
Italian Albums (FIMI)	26
Japanese Western Albums (Oricon)	30
New Zealand Albums (RMNZ)	14
Norwegian Albums (VG-lista)	2
Polish Albums (ZPAV)	3
Portuguese Albums (AFP)	20
Scottish Albums (Official Charts)	3
Spanish Albums (Promusicae)	5
Swedish Albums (Sverigetopplistan)	1
Swedish Hard Rock Albums (Sverigetopplistan)	1
Swiss Albums (Schweizer Hitparade)	1
UK Albums (Official Charts)	2
UK Rock & Metal Albums (Official Charts)	1
US Billboard 200	1
US Independent Albums (Billboard)	1
US Top Rock & Alternative Albums (Billboard)	1

=== Year-end charts ===
Year-end chart performance for Skeletá
Chart (2025)	Position
Belgian Albums (Ultratop Flanders)	160
German Albums (Offizielle Top 100)	88
Swedish Albums (Sverigetopplistan)	22
