= Oimara =

German singer-songwriter (born 1992)

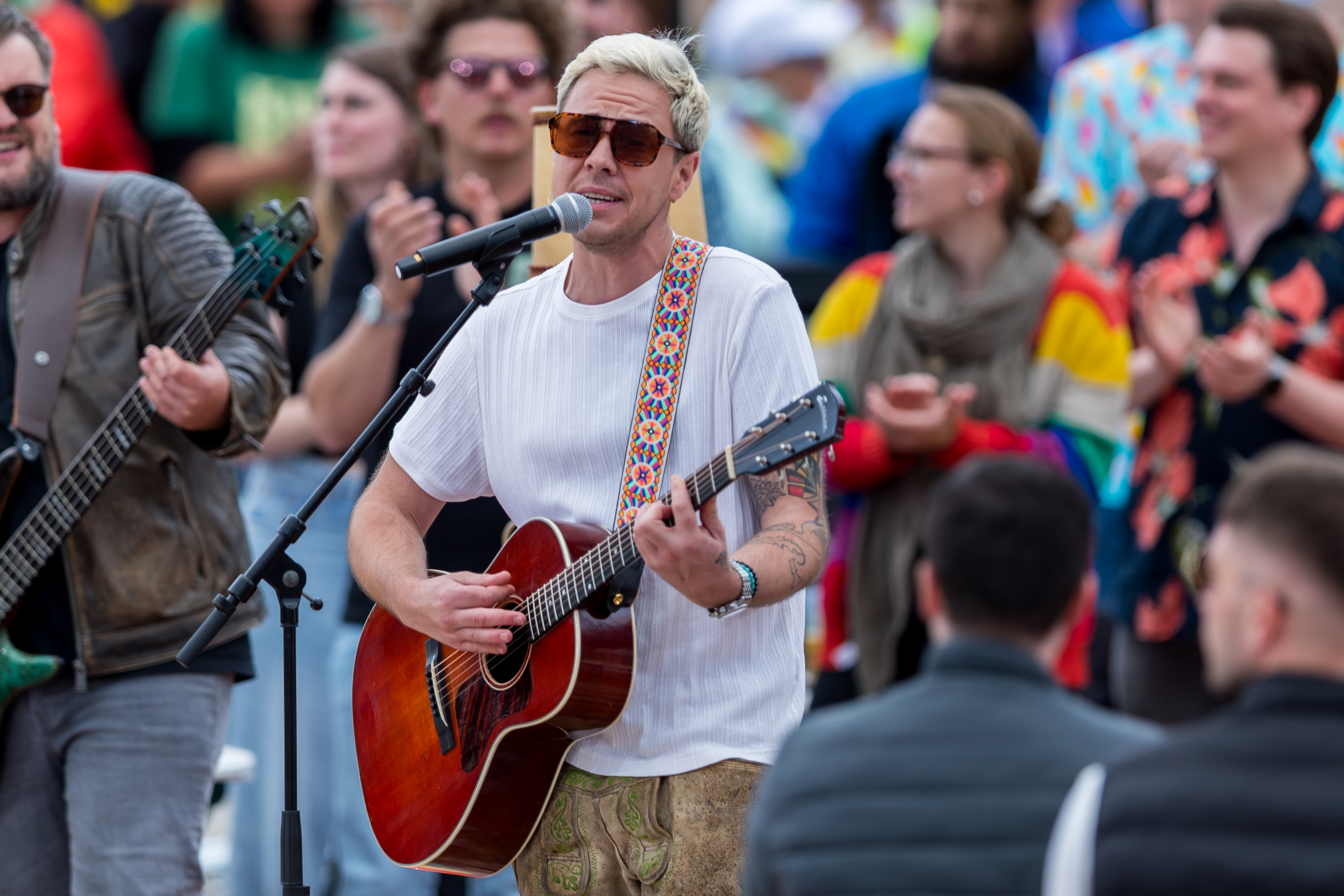
- Oimara in 2025

Background information
- Born: Benedikt Hafner; 6 February 1992 (age 33); Tegernsee, Bavaria, Germany
- Occupations: Singer; songwriter

Benedikt Hafner (born 6 February 1992), known professionally as Oimara, is a German singer-songwriter. He had a hit with the song "Wackelkontakt", which reached No. 1 in the Austrian, German and Swiss charts in 2025.

== Early life ==
Beni Hafner was born in Tegernsee and grew up on the Hafner-Alm, a mountain pasture run by his parents. They ran a restaurant and an animal sanctuary there. At the age of 17, he briefly emigrated to Mallorca to work as a chef. He then studied hotel management. After four years, however, Hafner returned and began working as a singer-songwriter. He adopted the stage name "Oimara", which is Bavarian for "Almerer", meaning someone from the alpine pastures. A particular trademark is his Bavarian dialect.

== Musical career ==
Oimara's first major success was the mobile phone video for "Bierle in da Sun", which was viewed 1.4 million times. His debut studio album, Bierle in da Sun, was released in 2018 via Bogner Records. A Quantum Prost (a play on James Bond 007: Quantum of Solace) followed in 2020, which received little attention during the COVID-19 pandemic, as all performance opportunities were canceled. In 2020, he released the title song for director Sebastian Schindler's comedy Mit dem Rückwärtsgang nach vorn (With the Reverse Gear Forward) with Otto Anna Maoam.

Oimara's third studio album Wannabe was released in 2022. After a large number of singles, his breakthrough came in 2025 with the single "Wackelkontakt", which reached number 1 on the German singles chart and became the après-ski and carnival hit of the 2025 season. According to media reports, it was the first number-one hit sung in Bavarian since "Skandal im Sperrbezirk" (1981) by Spider Murphy Gang.

== Discography ==
=== Studio albums ===
- 2018: Bierle in da Sun (Bogner Records)
- 2020: A Quantum Prost (Bogner Records)
- 2022: Wannabe (Stereopolrecords)
- 2025: Lampenfieber (Stereopolrecords)

=== EPs ===
- 2023: Zebrastreifenpferd (Stereopolrecords)

=== Singles ===
- 2019: "Bussi Baby"
- 2020: "Busheislparty"
- 2020: "Otto Anna Maoam"
- 2021: "Heid is ma wurscht"
- 2021: "Lieblingsdepp"
- 2021: "Seit du weg bist"
- 2021: "Bonzenkarre"
- 2021: "Krass verliebt"
- 2021: "Nie wieder ohne"
- 2021: "Huhnwalk"
- 2022: "An so vui Tag"
- 2022: "Wannabe"
- 2023: "Kissen (The Place to Be)"
- 2023: "Gardasee (Endlich über’n Brenner!)" (with Ringlstetter & Max Kronseder)
- 2023: "Emoji Baby"
- 2023: "Steirisch oder Bayrisch" (with Julian Grabmayer and we lovemelodies)
- 2023: "Canale Grande"
- 2024: "I am aus Bayern"
- 2024: "Cocktailschirm im Arsch"
- 2024: "Onomatopoesie" (with Welovemelodies)
- 2024: "Wackelkontakt"
- 2024: "Es duad ma leid Mama"
- 2024: "Veni Vidi Vici"
- 2024: "Geile Nacht"
- 2024: "Wla Wla Wla"
- 2024: "Dubaischokolade"
- 2025: Kunst (Schalalala Bum Bum)
- 2025: Zebrastreifenpferd (Malle Mix) (with Honk! & Kreisligalegende)
- 2025: Anlieger frei (Hände hoch)
- 2025: Déjà-vu
- 2025: Koa Bergbauernbua (with Melissa Naschenweng)
