= Yoon Hye-jin =

Mr. Handy, Mr. Hong and Hometown Cha-Cha-Cha character

- Mr. Handy, Mr. Hong and Hometown Cha-Cha-Cha character
- First appearance: Mr. Handy, Mr. Hong; 2004
- Last appearance: Hometown Cha-Cha-Cha; 2021
- Created by: Kang Seok-beom and Shin Jeong-goo
- Portrayed by: Uhm Jung-hwa (2004); Shin Min-ah (2021) (Note: In drama version); Oh Ye-ju (2021; teenage); Shim Hye-yeon (2021; child)

In-universe information
- Full name: Yoon Hye-jin

Korean name
- Hangul: 윤혜진
- RR: Yun Hyejin
- MR: Yun Hyejin
- Nickname: Chikwa
- Occupation: Multi-lingual interpreter Korean, Chinese, Japanese, English, Italian, French
- Family: Yoon Tae-hwa (father); Lee Myung-shin (step-mother)
- Significant other: Hong Du-sik
- Origin: Seoul
- Nationality: South Korean
- Birth year: 1988

Yoon Hye-jin (Korean: 윤혜진), frequently referred to by the nickname Chikwa (치과; lit. 'Dentist'), is a fictional character who serves as the protagonist in both the 2004 film Mr. Handy, Mr. Hong and the 2021 television series Hometown Cha-Cha-Cha. In these romantic comedies, the character is depicted as an urban Seoul dentist who relocates to a seaside village, where she eventually meets her love interest Hong Du-sik.

The character was originally created by screenwriters Kang Seok-beom and Shin Jeong-goo and portrayed by Uhm Jung-hwa in the 2004 film. She was later reimagined by screenwriter Shin Ha-eun for the 2021 series Hometown Cha-Cha-Cha, which featured Shin Min-a in the role. Produced by Studio Dragon and GTist, the 16-episode series aired on tvN and reached a global audience through its release on Netflix.

== Appearances ==
=== Mr. Handy, Mr. Hong ===
In the original film, Hye-jin is a dentist who relocates to the village. The plot follows her frequent, often comedic, clashes with the local "fixer," Hong Du-sik. Her character trajectory highlights the softening of her urban perspective; her bickering with Du-sik eventually reveals a mutual attraction, though the film concludes with a realization of her feelings after a period of separation.

=== Hometown Cha-Cha-Cha ===
The 2021 series expands on her professional background and personal development. Upon moving to Gongjin to open a dental clinic, Hye-jin struggles to integrate with the residents, who find her mannerisms cold and elitist. Hong Du-sik serves as a cultural bridge for her, helping her understand the village's interpersonal dynamics. Her journey is defined by her growing empathy and her role in balancing her personal ambition with her newfound community ties.

== Characterization ==
=== Characterization and background ===
Uhm Jung-hwa described Yoon Hye-jin as a woman who is far from ordinary. Hye-jin frequently finds herself in absurd situations. Haughty and fastidious, she also exhibits germophobia and perfectionism. Uhm characterizes the role as a dentist who makes many mistakes, experiences hurt, and pretends to be strong. Defined by professional righteousness and stubbornness, Hye-jin often finds these traits place her at odds with the conventional social expectations of the medical elite. After meeting Du-sik, she frequently encounters precarious situations that necessitate adaptation. Ultimately, she is gradually drawn to the charm of Du-sik, whom she initially disregarded due to their differing social positions.

The character's narrative origins vary significantly between the 2004 film and the 2021 television series. In the film, Hye-jin's confrontational stance toward a patient leads to her resignation and subsequent blacklisting in Seoul. Lacking financial resources, she relocates to the countryside to establish a private practice, where she first meets Du-sik while scouting for a clinic location. In contrast, the series depicts Hye-jin as a Gangnam dentist who resigns following a dispute with her employer regarding ethical patient care. Following an impulsive, alcohol-induced public critique of her workplace on an online forum, she decides to resign and open an independent practice in the coastal village of Gongjin.

Hye-jin's backstory also differs across the two versions. While she is estranged from her father and grieving a deceased mother in both, the details of her upbringing diverge. The film portrays her as a wealthy daughter who left home during college and seeks financial independence to repay her father. The series provides a more grounded history, establishing her birth year as 1988 and noting her reliance on dental school scholarships. In this version, her mother succumbed to a terminal illness during Hye-jin's youth, prompting her father's decline into alcoholism. Gongjin beach was the site of her last vacation with her mother, which is why she visits there on the anniversary of her mother's death, where she first encounters Du-sik.

=== Relationship with Hong Du-sik ===
The relationship between Hong Du-sik and Yoon Hye-jin follows an "enemies-to-lovers" dynamic. The story begins when Hye-jin, a dentist from Seoul, opens a clinic in the seaside village and repeatedly encounters Du-sik during crises. Initially, she refers to him by his title, "Hong Banjang," while he simply calls her "Dentist," a dynamic that creates a sense of professional distance and keeps their interactions from becoming overly personal too quickly.

In the 2004 film, Hye-jin's frequent bickering with Du-sik ultimately serves to bring the pair closer together. However, after he rejects her romantic confession, she leaves the village and returns to Seoul. It is only while attending a high-society event in the city that Hye-jin fully realizes the depth of her feelings for him. She returns. Later she encourages Du-sik to take his grandfather's boat back out to sea.

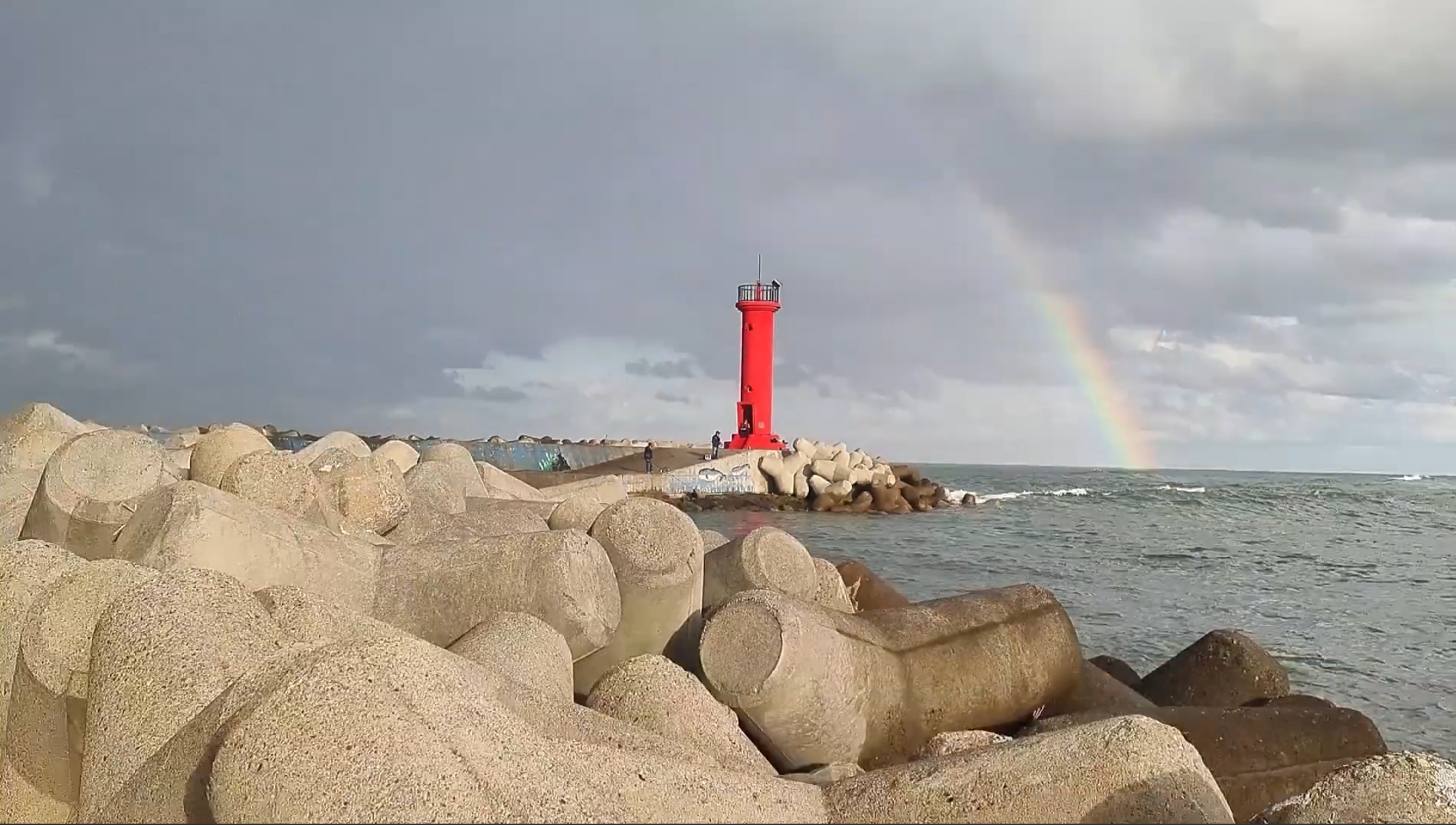
The Red Lighthouse in Seokbyeong-ri (pictured)

By contrast, the 2021 television series emphasizes Hye-jin's gradual integration into the Gongjin community. She relies on Du-sik to act as a bridge, which helps her earn the trust of the villagers and establish her place among them. Unlike the film's narrative, Hye-jin's confession is accepted, leading the two into a formal romantic relationship. Her commitment is later tested when she discovers details about his hidden past through a third party. By patiently giving Du-sik the space he requires, Hye-jin allows him to eventually open up, enabling them to move forward together. In the series finale, during a pre-wedding photoshoot, she asks him to add her name to his grandfather's boat, a gesture that symbolizes her official integration into his family.

== Creation ==
=== Character creation ===
The character was originally created by screenwriters Kang Seok-beom and Shin Jeong-goo for the 2004 film Mr. Handy, Mr. Hong. The film's full Korean title, Ŏdisŏn'ga nugun'gaë musŭn iri saenggimyŏn t'ŭllimŏpsi nat'ananda Hong panjang (어디선가 누군가에 무슨 일이 생기면 틀림없이 나타난다 홍반장; 'If something happens to someone somewhere, Hong Banjang will surely appear'), holds the record for the second-longest title in South Korean cinema history. This title pays homage to the Japanese anime Astroganger, establishing the protagonist as a neighborhood hero who arrives whenever help is needed, which mirrors the film's central plot of Hong Banjang (Hong Du-sik) consistently appearing whenever Hye-jin encounters difficulty.

When screenwriter Shin Ha-eun was approached for the 2021 television remake, she was initially hesitant. She worried that a remake might diminish the legacy of the original film and its lead actor, Kim Joo-hyuk, with whom she had worked on her first miniseries, Argon. Shin eventually chose to proceed after re-watching the original film and imagining how the characters, particularly the lead Hye-jin, would function in 2021. She viewed the original film's focus on the leads at the expense of supporting characters as a narrative opportunity. To fill these gaps, she created an ensemble of 16 residents for the fictional village of Gongjin, each with a distinct backstory. This expansion allowed the remake to establish its own identity while honoring the spirit of the original.

=== Casting ===
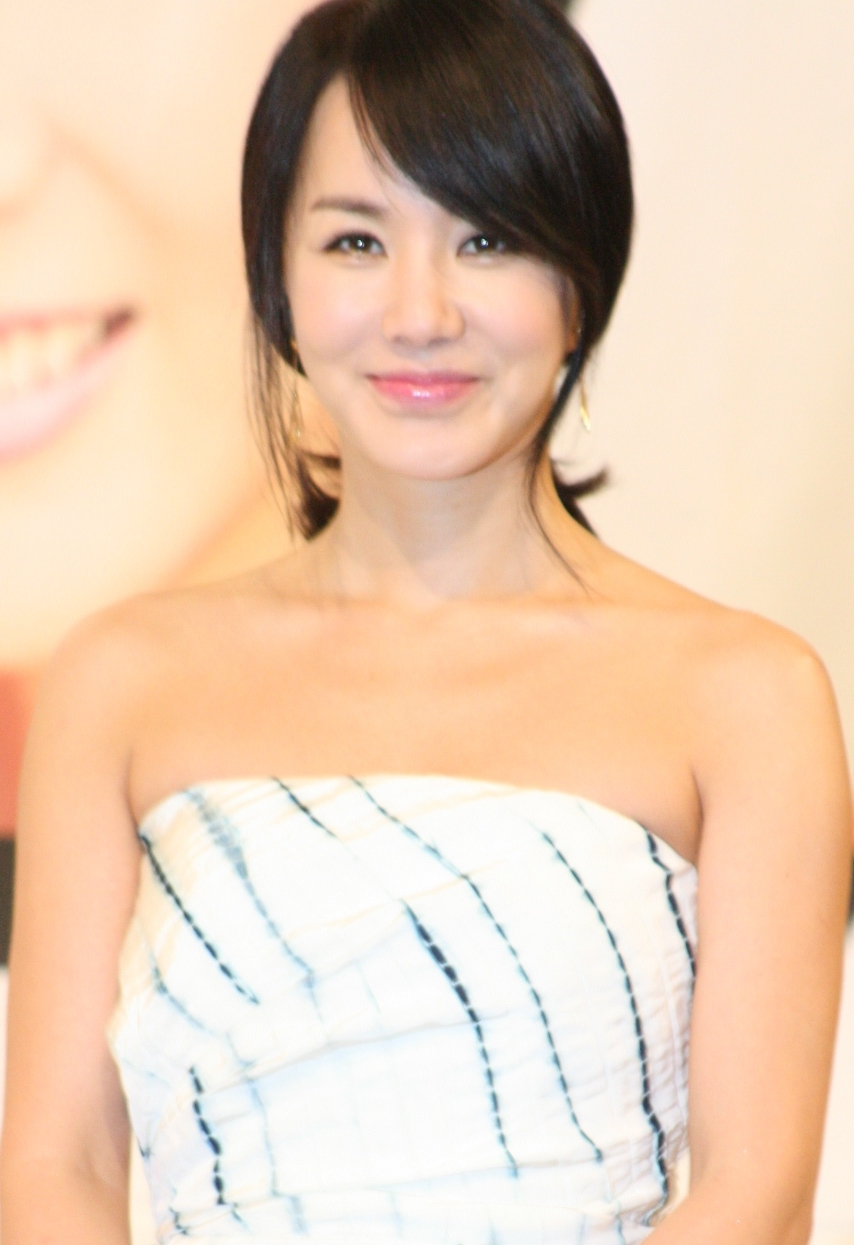
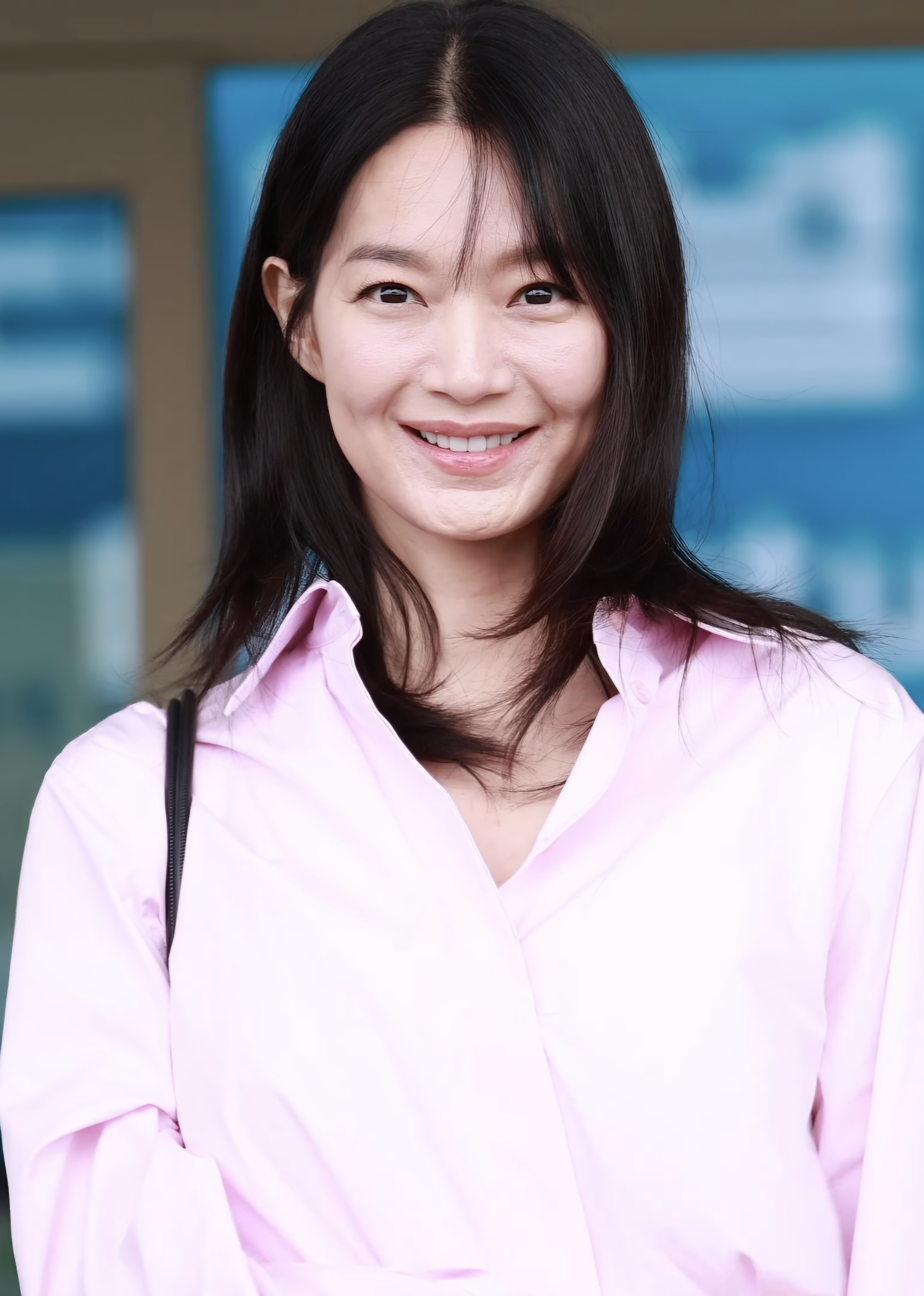
Uhm Jung-hwa (L) acted as Yoon Hye-jin in film version, while Shin Min-ah (R) acted as Yoon Hye-jin in drama version

On October 10, 2003, it was announced that Uhm Jung-hwa had been cast in a lead role in Mr. Handy, Mr. Hong. The film marked a reunion for Uhm and co-star Kim Joo-hyuk, who had previously appeared together in the 2003 film Singles; however, Mr. Handy, Mr. Hong served as their first project portraying a romantic couple. Filming was scheduled to commence on October 25, 2003. Produced by Zenith Entertainment, the film was the directorial debut of Kang Seok-beom, with a screenplay written by Kang and Shin Jung-goo.

Reflecting on her decision to join the project, Uhm described the character as "pretty," characterizing Hye-jin as perfectionist dentist prone to mistakes who masked her underlying vulnerability with a facade of strength. Uhm also praised her co-star, Kim Joo-hyuk, describing him as "a truly eccentric person" who was "quirky yet funny." She noted, "As an actor, I liked how well he helped his co-stars grasp their emotions." Reflecting on the production's demands, she cited the final scene at a Jeju coastal breakwater as particularly challenging to film.

Plans to adapt Mr. Handy, Mr. Hong into a drama series were first announced on December 21, 2020, under the working title Hong Banjang. The adaptation was written by Shin Ha-eun with Shin Min-a cast in the lead role and Kim Seon-ho cast as Hong Du-sik. On April 2, 2021, it was officially announced that Yoo Je-won would direct the drama. The series marked director Yoo's second collaboration with Shin, following their work on Tomorrow with You (2017). It also marked Shin's return to romantic comedy after five years. Attracted to the script's composition and her character, Hye-jin, Shin sought a "softhearted, feel-good" project to balance her previous genre-diverse roles. She also praised co-star Kim Seon-ho, noting that his considerate personality and strong acting chemistry allowed for the creative flexibility she desired.

== Legacy and impact ==
=== Reception ===
Editor of Cine21 Jeong Jin-hwan praised Uhm Jung-hwa's portrayal of Yoon Hye-jin as "charming." In 2004, she received a Special Award at the 27th Golden Cinematography Awards.

Shin Min-ah's later interpretation of the character in the television series Hometown Cha-Cha-Cha drew significant domestic and international audiences. Airing concurrently on tvN and Netflix from August to October 2021, the series achieved peak ratings of 13.322%, ranking it among the highest-rated series in Korean cable television history. The series also saw immense global success, spending 16 weeks on Netflix's non-English Top 10 list and charting in over 20 countries.

Critics noted the strength of the lead performances; Matt O'Neill said that her chemistry with Kim Seonho "is akin to that of Julia Roberts and Richard Gere in Pretty Woman," while Pierce Conran of the South China Morning Post described the duo as having "perfect chemistry."

Industry metrics also reflected high levels of viewer engagement throughout the series' run. Shin consistently placed the Good Data's "Drama Performer Buzzworthiness" rankings, securing the second position for several consecutive weeks from late August through September 2021, and remaining in the top five through mid-October. In September 2021, the Korea Corporate Reputation Research Institute placed her third in its drama actor brand reputation rankings. The 2021 Big Data Utilization Hallyu Market Research, published by the Ministry of Culture, Sports and Tourism and KOFICE on April 18, 2022, identified Shin and Hometown Cha-Cha-Cha as prominent global keywords for 2021 K-dramas.

In the 2021 Gallup Korea's year-end poll, Shin comes second after Kim Seon-ho as Television Actor of the Year. She was also nominated for the Popularity Star Award and later received the Top Excellence Award for an Actress in a Miniseries at the 2022 APAN Star Awards.

=== Cultural influence ===
The drama also sparked a "Gaetcha Craze," causing a surge in demand for products featured on screen. The wine Hye-jin gifted Du-sik in the fifth episode, as well as her designer handbags, temporarily sold out following their appearance. Interest in Hye-jin's overall fashion, including her clothing, jewelry, and footwear, increased significantly, with critics praising her style for balancing sophistication with a unique, charming aesthetic.

The series also inspired creative works, such as the song "Hometown" by Yael Yuzon, frontman of the Filipino rock band Sponge Cola. Yuzon composed the track after being inspired by the central romance, describing it as a "balance of light and weight." He considered several alternative titles for the song, including "Penguins and Polar Bears," referencing Hye-jin's own words during her love confession in the series.

=== The "Hallyu Pilgrimage" ===
The 2004 film Mr. Handy, Mr. Hong was filmed on Jeju Island. A primary location was Beophwan Village in Seogwipo, situated on Course 7 of the Jeju Olle Trail. This 1.3 kilometer coastal segment between Beophwan Port and World Cup Road provides views of Beomseom Island. These locations have since become tourism destinations for fans of the film.

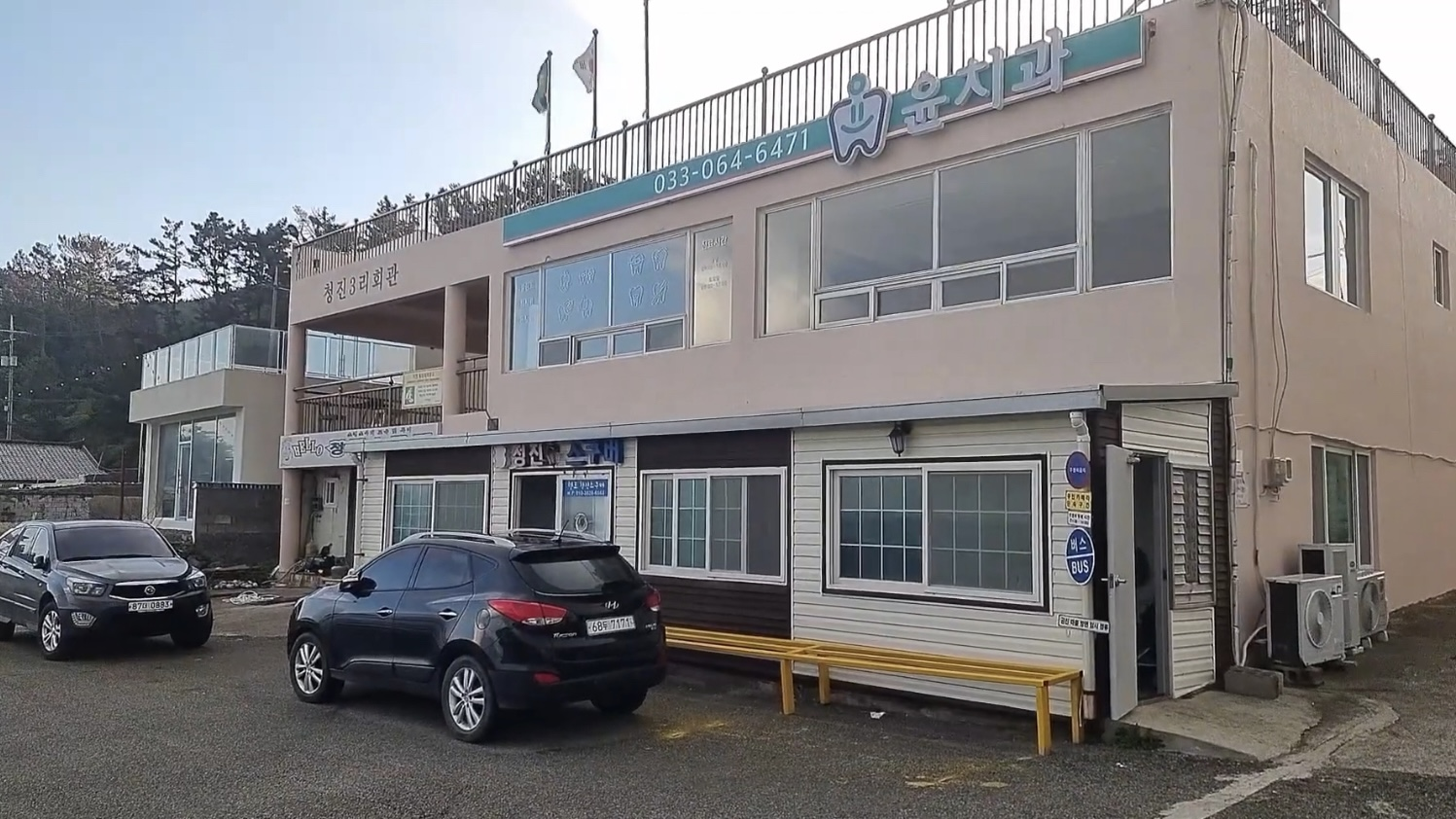
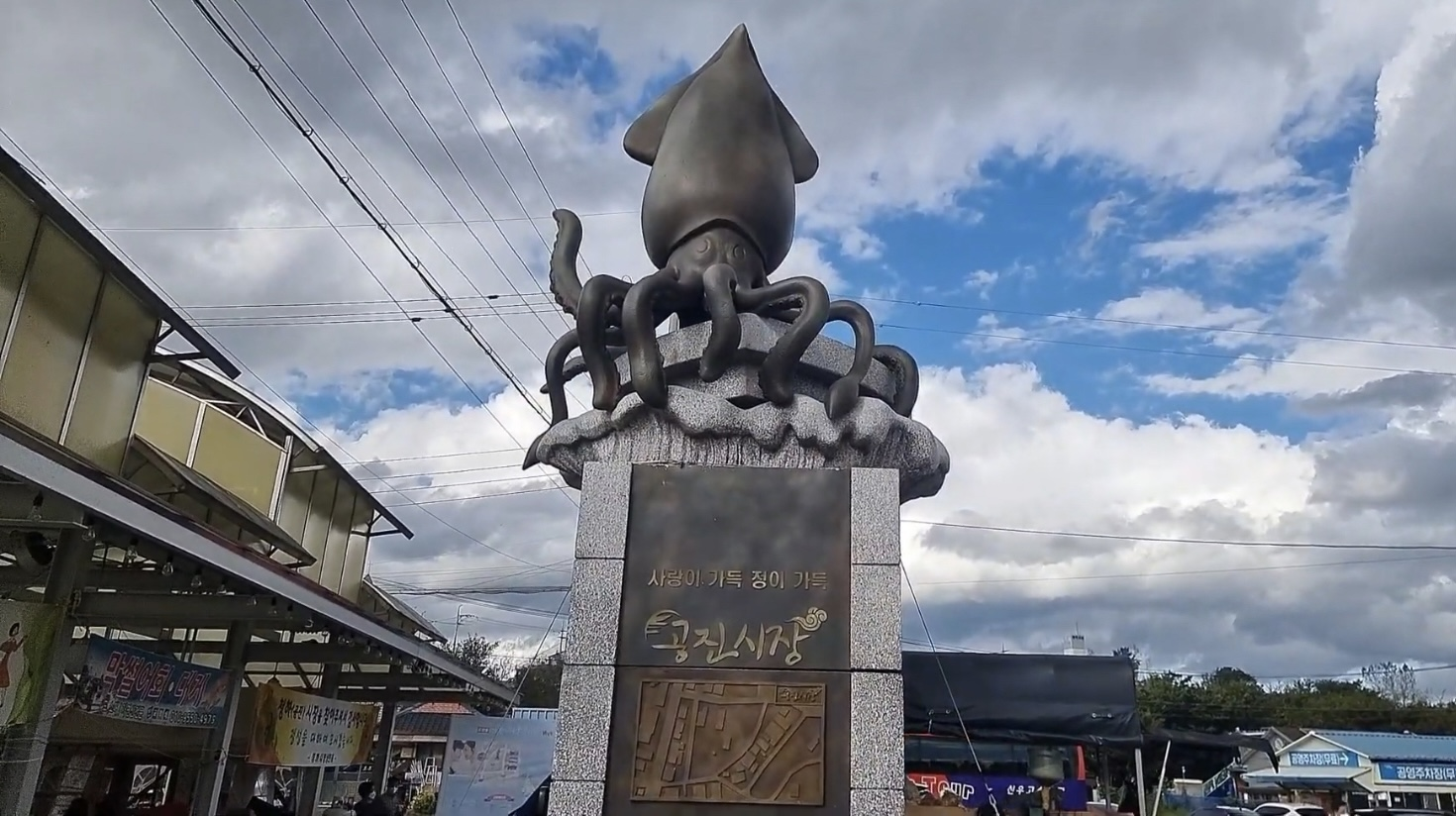
Filming locations in Pohang: Yoon Chikwa (top) and Squid Statue Cheongha Market (bottom)

While the original film established a baseline for location based interest, the 2021 drama Hometown Cha-Cha-Cha catalyzed significant set-jetting tourism in Pohang. Its filming sites became staples of travel itineraries, reportedly revitalizing the local economy and commercial district. For instance, the Seokbyeong-ri lighthouse and its coastal embankment, where Hye-jin confessed her feelings to Du-sik, have become popular photo spots for couples. Nearby, the Cheongjin-ri Village features the former Yoon Dental Clinic set, now a restaurant called Yoon's Clinic that preserves the drama's original decor.

Cheongha Market underwent a similar transition. Once a quiet hub of 25 shops operating on a five-day cycle, it was rebranded as Cheongha Gongjin Market after the series' fictional village. The market now preserves several permanent sets, including the Squid Statue, Bora Supermarket, and the Coffee by Day, Beer by Night café.

These local developments were integrated into national tourism campaigns by the Korea Tourism Organization (KTO). Following the broadcast of Hometown Cha-Cha-Cha, they partnered with Studio Dragon and Studio Dragon and LG U+ to create virtual reality content showcasing the drama's locations, made available on the LG U+ XR platform, U+DIVe, since November 24, 2021. In the same month, they showcased the filming locations on their Visit Korea website as a K-Drama tour destination. In February 2023, Cheongha Gongjin Market was included in the "2023 Hallyu Pilgrimage" promotion, which highlighted 53 locations across South Korea.

To sustain this interest, Pohang City invested 1.3 billion won between 2023 and 2025 to upgrade infrastructure at these landmarks. Improvements included new parking facilities, an international visitor lounge featuring a drama themed mural, and a renovation of the Squid Statue, which was formally inaugurated on February 27, 2025, by the mayor of Pohang. Under the slogan "Pohang, a City Like a Drama," the city aims to reach 10 million annual visitors by leveraging its former filming sites.

The series also contributed to tourism in Yangju, where the Chang Ucchin Museum of Art was featured in episode 12 as a dating spot of Hye-jin and Du-sik. Following this episode, officials noted a rise in inquiries about the museum, attracting viewers drawn to its unique architecture and natural surroundings.
