= Hong Du-sik =

Mr. Handy, Mr. Hong and Hometown Cha-Cha-Cha character

- Mr. Handy, Mr. Hong and Hometown Cha-Cha-Cha character
- Hong Du-sik showing his professional certificate(s), as portrayed by Kim Joo-hyuk (top) and Kim Seon-ho (bottom)
- First appearance: Mr. Handy, Mr. Hong; 2004
- Last appearance: Hometown Cha-Cha-Cha; 2021
- Created by: Kang Seok-beom and Shin Jeong-goo
- Portrayed by: Kim Joo-hyuk (2004); Kim Seon-ho (2021) (Note: Drama version); Moon Seong-hyun (2021; teenage); Ahn Seong-won (2021; young teenage); Song Min-jae (2021; child)

In-universe information
- Full name: Hong Du-sik

Korean name
- Hangul: 홍두식
- RR: Hong Dusik
- MR: Hong Tusik
- Nicknames: Hong Banjang

Korean name
- Hangul: 홍반장
- RR: Hong banjang
- MR: Hong panjang
- Position: Banjang (neighborhood chief)
- Affiliation: Ban 1, Tong 5, Gongjin-dong, Cheongho City
- Significant other: Yoon Hye-jin
- Origin: Gongjin-dong, Cheongho
- Nationality: South Korean
- Birthday: July 24, 1987

Hong Du-sik (Korean: 홍두식; pronounced [hoŋ.du.ɕik]), widely known by his nickname "Hong Banjang" (홍반장; [hoŋ.ban.dʑaŋ]; 'Chief Hong'), is a fictional character who serves as the main protagonist of the 2004 film Mr. Handy, Mr. Hong and its 2021 television adaptation Hometown Cha-Cha-Cha. He was originally created by screenwriters Kang Seok-beom and Shin Jeong-goo. Across his screen appearances, the character has been portrayed by several actors, most notably Kim Joo-hyuk in the 2004 film and Kim Seon-ho in the 2021 television series, alongside Moon Seong-hyun, Ahn Seong-won, and Song Min-jae portraying his younger years.

Although the 2004 film was a modest release, Kim Joo-hyuk's performance as Hong Banjang is frequently cited as his most memorable character. Screenwriter Shin Ha-eun, who adapted the film for television, described the character as an iconic part of late Kim Joo-hyuk's legacy, noting that "Hong Banjang" has since functioned as "a proper noun." Over time, "Hong Banjang" has evolved into a cultural archetype representing proactive neighborhood leaders and social workers, with media outlets frequently applying the moniker to real-life figures dedicated to public service.

Kim Seon-ho's later interpretation in Hometown Cha-Cha-Cha introduced the character to a wider international audience. Broadcast concurrently on tvN and Netflix from September to October 2021, the series achieved peak nationwide ratings of 13.322 percent, making it into the list of highest-rated series on Korean cable television. The adaptation also became one of Netflix's top Korean programs of 2021, charting in the Top 10 across more than 20 countries and remaining on the global non-English weekly charts for 16 consecutive weeks.

The cinematic and television adaptations each generated notable screen tourism, or set-jetting. While the 2004 film directed attention to Jeju Island's Beophwan Village, the 2021 television adaptation transformed Pohang into a major Hallyu pilgrimage destination. Featured locations, including the boat display at Sabang Memorial Park and the Squid Statue at Cheongha Gongjin Market, attracted large numbers of tourists, leading to municipal infrastructure investments. The Korea Tourism Organization later featured the locations on its Visit Korea website and incorporated them into national tourism campaigns.

== Appearance ==
=== Mr. Handy, Mr. Hong ===
Hong Du-sik made his debut in the romantic comedy film Mr. Handy, Mr. Hong (2004), portrayed by Kim Joo-hyuk. Known as "Hong Banjang," the character works as a fixer performing manual labor and odd jobs in his hometown. The film follows the romance between him and Yoon Hye-jin (Uhm Jung-hwa), a dentist from Seoul. Much of the plot relies on the comedic tension of Du-sik appearing to rescue Hye-jin whenever she encounters trouble.

=== Hometown Cha-Cha-Cha ===
Hong Du-sik is introduced in the first episode of the tvN television series Hometown Cha-Cha-Cha (2021) as the neighborhood chief, known locally as "Hong Banjang." Portrayed by Kim Seon-ho, the character appears in all 16 episodes as the story's main protagonist. He first encounters dentist Yoon Hye-jin (Shin Min-a) at Gongjin's beach after retrieving one of her high-heeled shoes from the sea while surfing. Alongside their central romance, the television narrative expands to explore the lives and personal stories of the various residents of Gongjin.

== Development ==
=== Character creation ===
The character Hong Du-sik, widely known as Hong Banjang, was originally created by screenwriters Kang Seok-beom and Shin Jeong-goo for the 2004 film Mr. Handy, Mr. Hong. Produced by Zenith Entertainment, the film was the directorial debut of Kang Seok-beom. The film's full Korean title, Ŏdisŏn'ga nugun'gaë musŭn iri saenggimyŏn t'ŭllimŏpsi nat'ananda Hong Panjang (어디선가 누군가에 무슨 일이 생기면 틀림없이 나타난다 홍반장; 'If something happens to someone somewhere, Hong Banjang will surely appear'), holds the record for the second-longest title in South Korean cinema history. This title pays homage to the Japanese anime Astroganger, establishing Hong Banjang as a neighborhood hero who arrives whenever help is needed. His "can-do-everything" trait frequently earned him comparisons to MacGyver.

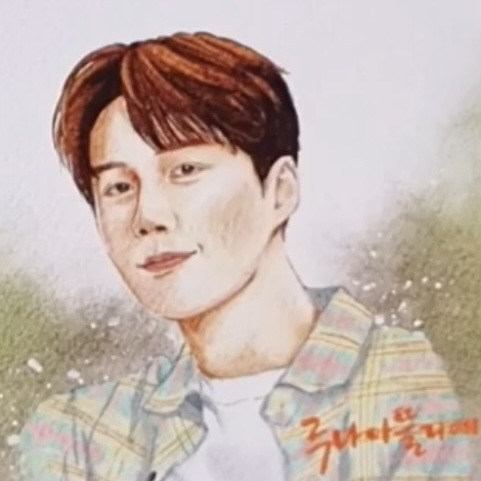
Sketch of Hong Du-sik from 2021 (pictured)

Plans to adapt the 2004 film Mr. Handy, Mr. Hong into a television series were first announced on December 21, 2020, under the working title Hong Banjang, with Shin Ha-eun attached as screenwriter. Yoo Je-won was officially confirmed as director on April 2, 2021.

Shin initially hesitated when approached for the remake, viewing the original character of Hong Banjang as an iconic cultural touchstone whose name functions almost as "a proper noun." She worried a new version might diminish the legacy of the film and its lead actor, Kim Joo-hyuk, with whom she had previously collaborated on her first miniseries, Argon. She ultimately decided to proceed after re-watching the original film and visualizing how the character would translate to a contemporary setting. Recognizing that the source material lacked developed supporting roles, she seized the opportunity to build an ensemble of sixteen distinct villagers for the fictional setting of Gongjin, giving each a fully realized backstory. This expansion allowed the remake to establish its own identity while honoring the spirit of the original.

The series further distinguishes itself by expanding on the protagonist's internal life. Shin introduced a significant subplot regarding a mysterious year following Du-sik's university graduation. By exploring his psychological trauma and survivor's guilt, the adaptation frames Du-sik's commitment to community service as a journey toward emotional recovery rather than simply a professional choice.

=== Character description and backstory ===
Hong Du-sik earned the title "Hong Banjang" through his status as neighborhood chief. Described as a jack-of-all-trades who can handle any task, he holds over twenty professional licenses, including real estate and electrical work. In the 2004 film, he serves as village chief of his seaside hometown for six years, keeping his services accessible at a flat rate of 50,000 KRW per day. In the 2021 series, Du-sik acts as the local chief for three years for Ban 1, Tong 5 of Gongjin-dong, Cheongho, earning a semi-annual bonus of ₩50,000. Along with his extensive assortment of professional licenses, he also holds a barista certification. He earns his living through odd jobs billed at the 2021 minimum wage of ₩8,720 per hour. In his free time, he enjoys surfing and photography.

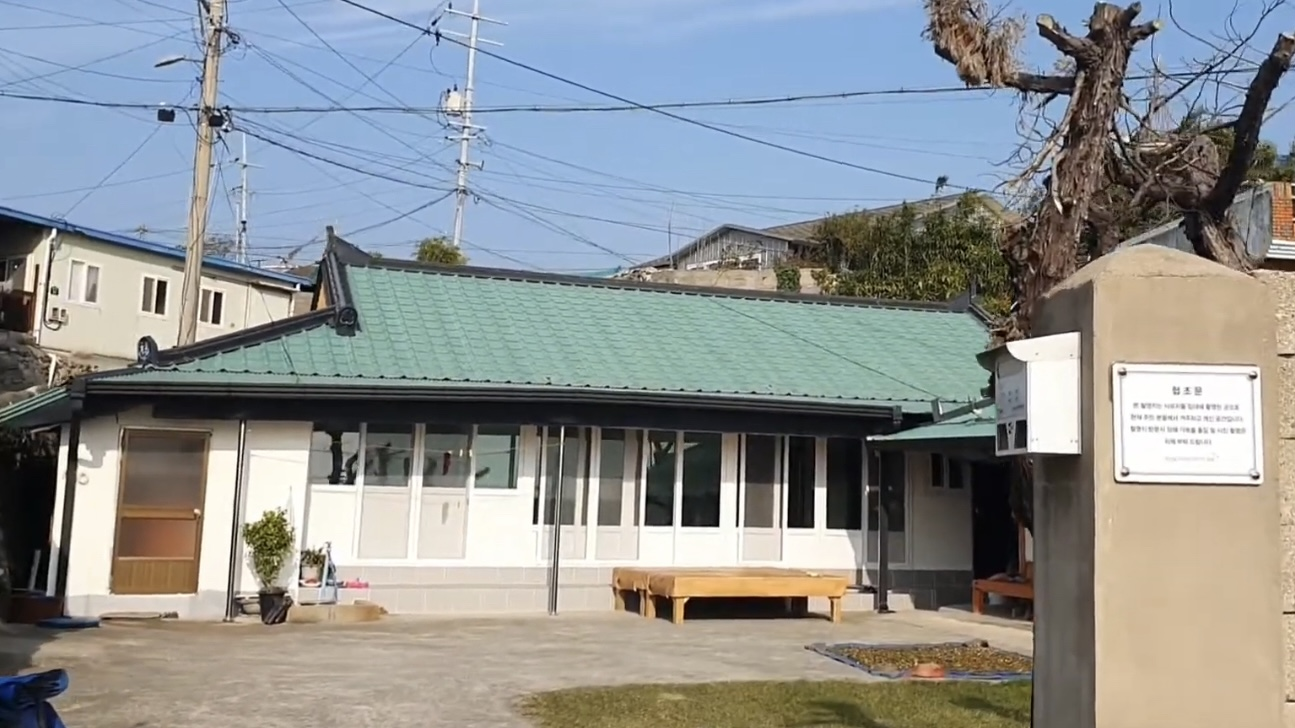
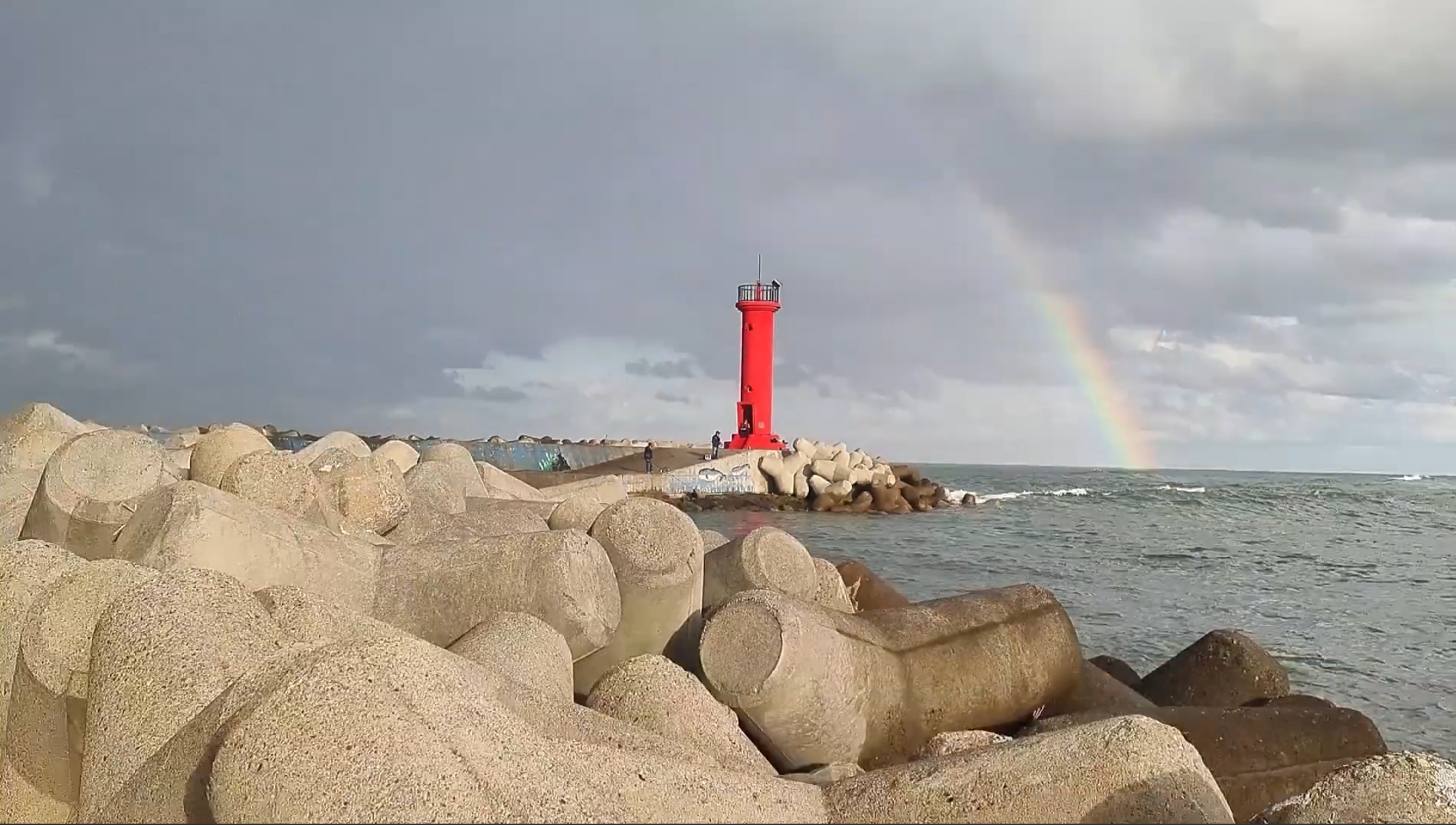
Filming locations in Pohang: Hong Du-sik's hanok house (top) and the Red Lighthouse in Seokbyeong-ri (bottom)

Du-sik resides in a seaside house inherited from his grandfather. In the 2004 film, the residence is a self-renovated former rice barn, which is filled with a collection of books, LP records and typewriters. In the 2021 series, his house is a remodeled hanok located near a red lighthouse. The interior features wooden flooring and exposed hanok rafters, complemented by vintage radios and a camera display. There is also a room divider filled with large glass jars of tamgŭmju (담금주; 'infused liquor').

Du-sik is an orphan. In the 2004 film, his parents die in a car accident; following their deaths, the townspeople collectively arranged for the local rice shop owner to adopt him, a community effort that helped him grow into a cheerful and kind-hearted man. The 2021 series provides a more detailed background, establishing his birth date as July 24, 1987. After losing his parents, he was raised by his grandfather, an oil vendor. During his middle school years, his grandfather died of a heart attack while Du-sik was attending a World Cup viewing event. Following this loss, the residents of Gongjin, led by Kim Gam-ri, assumed responsibility for his upbringing.

Both versions note that Du-sik graduated from Seoul National University, with the drama specifying a mechanical engineering degree. This academic background contrasts with his current lifestyle, sparking rumors among local residents regarding his "missing years." This period lasts three years in the film and five years in the drama, the latter of which attributes his absence to a career in Seoul and a traumatic accident that caused psychological distress before his return to Gongjin. Du-sik's fear of losing loved ones is symbolized by a fishing boat on the hill that belonged to his grandfather. Despite the boat no longer sailing, Du-sik spends his free time carefully maintaining it. The drama depicts Du-sik spending a small fortune to move it higher to a hilltop, allowing the vessel, named Soon-im after his grandmother, to rest with a view of the ocean.

=== Relationship with Yoon Hye-jin ===
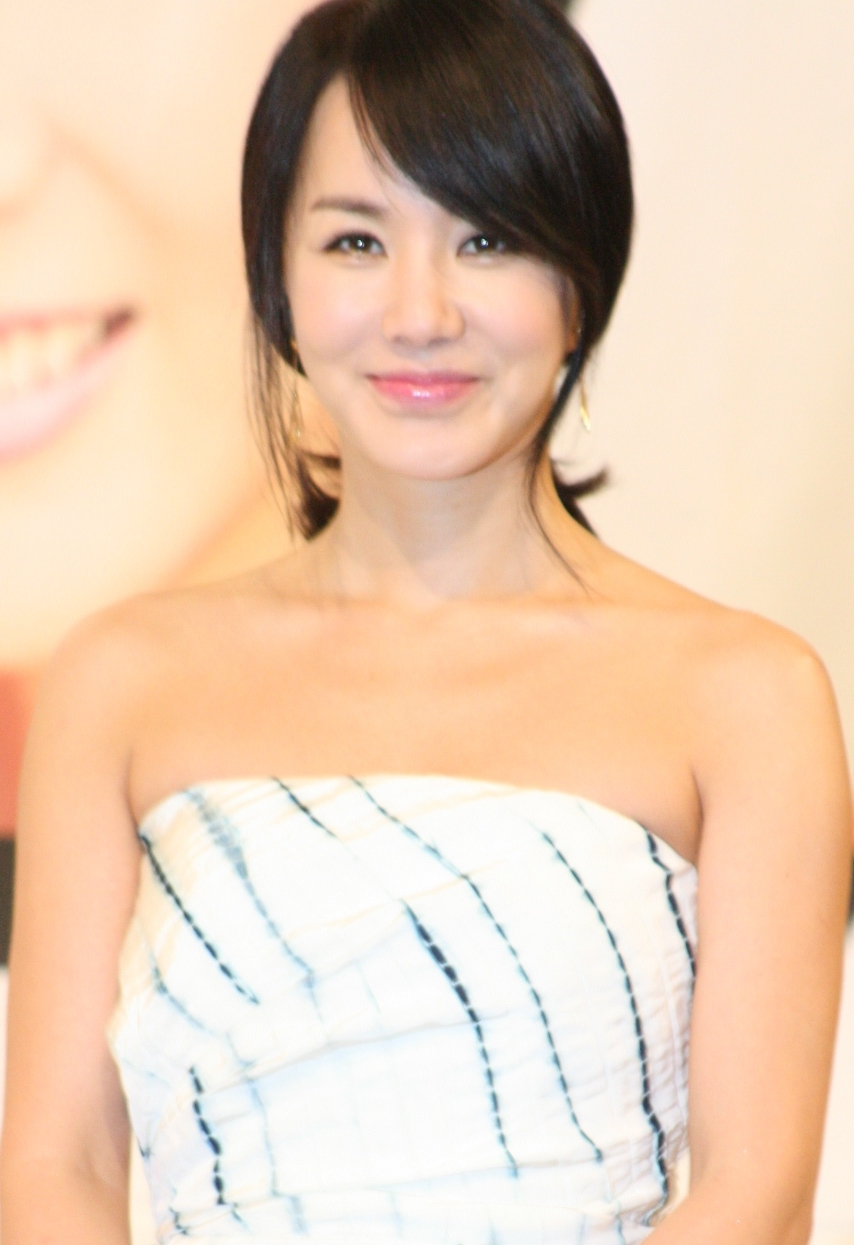
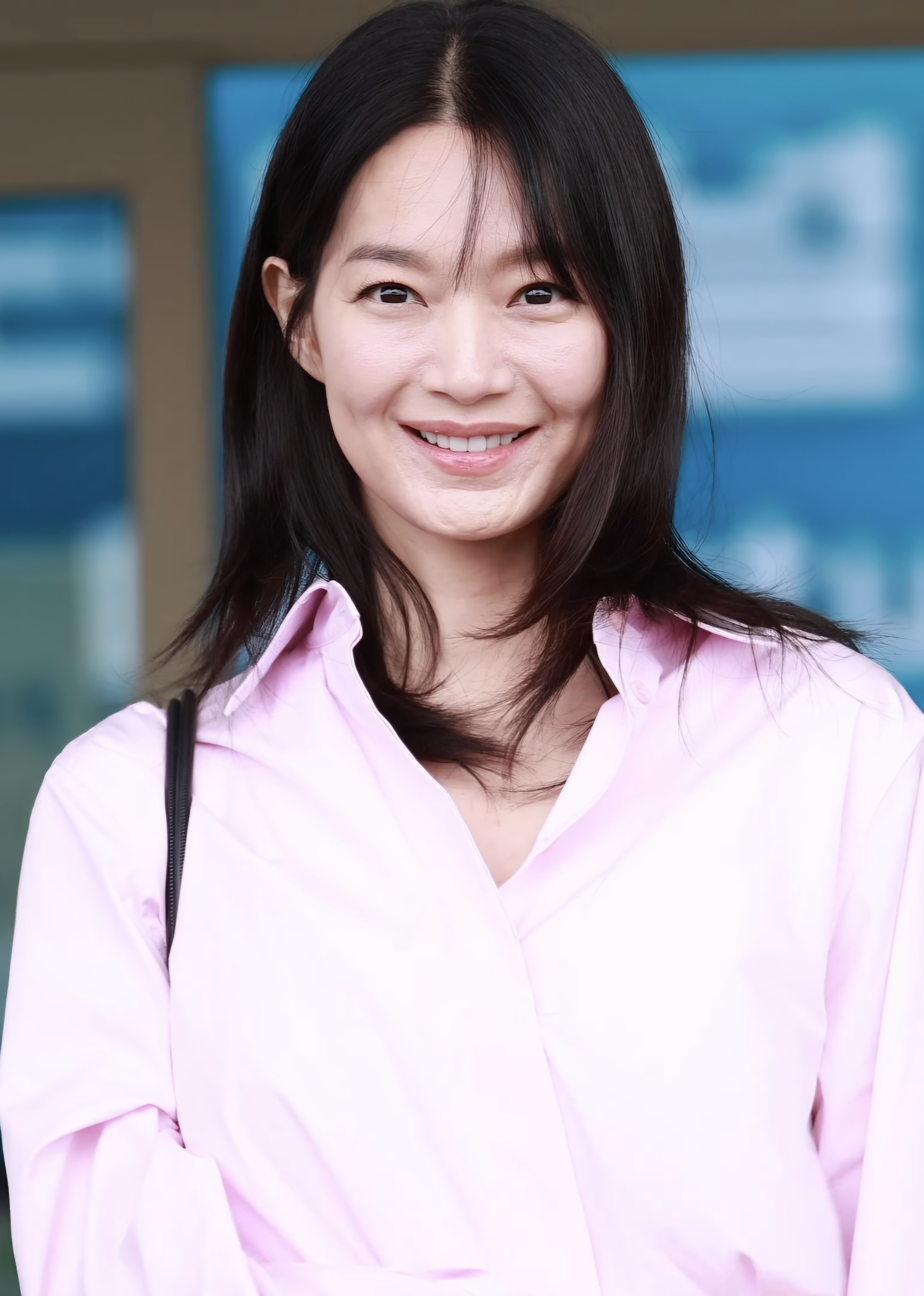
Uhm Jung-hwa (L) acted as Yoon Hye-jin in film version, while Shin Min-ah (R) acted as Yoon Hye-jin in drama version

The relationship between Hong Du-sik and Yoon Hye-jin follows an enemies-to-lovers dynamic. After moving from Seoul to open a clinic in a seaside village, dentist Yoon Hye-jin repeatedly encounters Du-sik during various crises. Initially, they address each other simply as "Dentist" and "Hong Banjang." In the film, Du-sik speaks to Hye-jin in banmal because he is 31 years old in Korean age, making him one year her senior. In contrast, the television series depicts him using banmal with all village residents regardless of age or status.

The narrative centers on the couple's constant bickering, which paradoxically draws them closer together. Although this connection grows, Du-sik rejects Hye-jin's initial confession of love, prompting her to return to Seoul. However, after attending a high-society event in the city, she realizes her true feelings and travels back to the village, where Du-sik is waiting for her at home with a closet stocked with her favorite wines. Later, she suggests that he take his late grandfather's boat out to sea again, signaling her commitment to stay by his side.

By contrast, the 2021 drama series emphasizes the village of Gongjin as a tight-knit community, with Du-sik acting as a bridge to help Hye-jin earn the locals' trust and find her place among them. Unlike in the film, Du-sik accepts her confession, and the two begin a relationship. Their bond faces a test when Hye-jin learns about his hidden past from a third party. Giving him the necessary space allows Du-sik to finally open up about his trauma, enabling them to move forward together. In the final episode, during a pre-wedding photoshoot, Hye-jin asks Du-sik to add her name to his grandfather's boat to symbolize her integration into his family.

== Casting and portrayal ==
On October 10, 2003, it was announced that Kim Joo-hyuk had been cast in a lead role in Mr. Handy, Mr. Hong. It was also reported that the filming will start on October 25, 2003. He initially expressed reservations about his casting, saying: "At first, I wondered why the director gave me the script. I've never lived in the countryside, and all the roles I’ve played so far have had a strong city person vibe. I tried my best to look like a country bumpkin, but to be honest, my biggest regret is that I couldn't completely shed my city person vibe as Hong Banjang." In another interview, he suggested that the role was a "perfect fit" for Im Chang-jung.

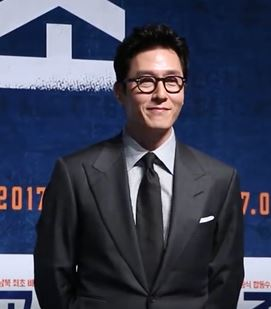
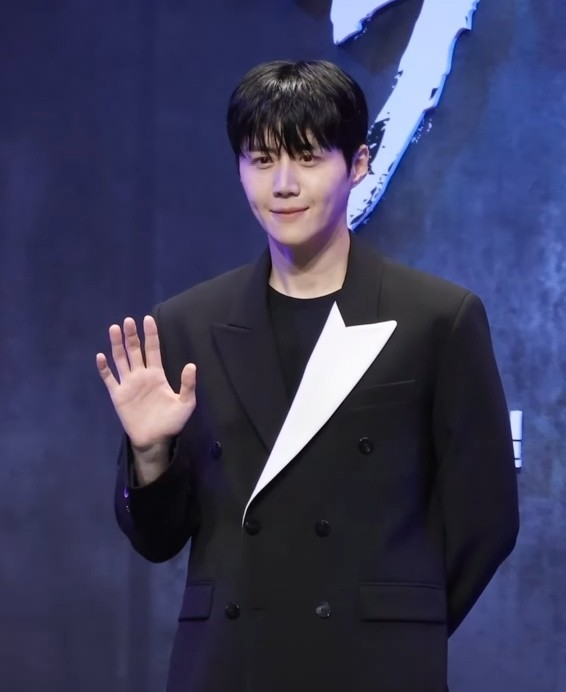
Kim Joo-hyuk (left) portrayed Hong Banjang in the film version and Kim Seon-ho (right) portrayed Hong Banjang in the drama version

To prepare for scenes where his character fills in as a live performer, Kim began private guitar lessons in November 2003. He described the process as difficult. He learned two songs for the film: Yoo Jae-ha's "You in My Arms" and Kim Kwang-seok's "With the mind to forget," the latter of which was included on the official soundtrack album.

Critical reception later characterized the role as uniquely suited him, with some suggesting the film served as a vehicle for his talents. He reflected, "I am somewhat similar to Du-sik in that I act quirky on the outside, even though that's not how I feel inside. The script was good, so I didn't force the humor and just naturally adapted to the situation."

Plans to adapt the film into a television series were first announced on December 21, 2020, with Kim Seon-ho in talks to star as Hong Banjang. His casting was officially confirmed on April 2, 2021. He accepted the role because he was moved by the beauty of every line in the script and wanted to appear somewhat ordinary. He noted that a fellow actor described the story as similar to a theatrical play, likening Gongjin Village to a stage where each resident exists with their own story. Rather than being driven by grand plot lines, he felt that simply existing within that setting would make him happy as an actor. He observed that while most characters race toward objectives like winning someone over or attaining status, the drama focuses on simply living in the space, advising newcomers, expressing affection, and chatting with neighbors, depicting life without special, dramatic incidents, which was a type of work he had been eager to try.

To prepare for the role, Kim Seon-ho also took on various private courses, including learning how to surf and making coffee as a barista. He also practiced playing the guitar in order to cover "Old Love" by Lee Moon-sae in the drama. Co-star Shin Min-a praised Kim, stating, "Surprisingly, Kim Seon-ho is good at everything. He has a good sense of humor and flexibility, and he even sings well. He matches the character so well that it makes you wonder, 'How can he be so good at everything?' He is an actor that young people especially love these days, after all. I think a lovable Hong Banjang will be born."

== Legacy and impact ==
=== Reception ===
Kim Joo-hyuk's portrayal of Hong Banjang in his first leading film role, Mr. Handy, Mr. Hong, is frequently cited as a career-defining performance. Executive producer of the film, Kim Doo-chan dubbed him as "the best romantic comedy actor" and "Korea's Hugh Grant." Although the film was not a major box-office success, critic Lee Saeng-heon praised his performance, noting that it relied heavily on personal charisma and warmth. In a 2017 posthumous survey, Hong Banjang was voted as his most memorable role.

Kim Seon-ho's later interpretation of the character in the television series Hometown Cha-Cha-Cha drew significant domestic and international audiences. When it aired concurrently on tvN and Netflix from September to October, the series achieved peak ratings of 13.322%, making it one of the highest-rated series in Korean cable television history. It also ranked among 2021 Netflix’s most-watched non-English programs, charting in the Top 10 across more than 20 countries, and remaining on the global non-English weekly charts for 16 consecutive weeks.

Regarding the performances, critic Han Su-jin compared the two, observing that "while Kim Joo-hyuk's Hong Banjang is an upright pine tree, Kim Seon-ho's is more like a sweet-smelling fruit tree." Writing for Entermedia, columnist Jeong Deok-hyeon noted that Kim Seon-ho carried on the legacy of the original character, remarking that "Goo-taeng Hyung (Note: Kim Joo-hyuk's nickname in 2 Days 1 Night) would be proud of him." Critic Matt O'Neill praised Shin Min-a's chemistry with Kim, saying it "is akin to that of Julia Roberts and Richard Gere in Pretty Woman," while Pierce Conran of the South China Morning Post described the duo as having "perfect chemistry." In 2025, Screen Rant ranked them ninth on its list of the twenty greatest K-drama couples.

Industry metrics also reflected high levels of viewer engagement throughout the series' run. Kim Seon-ho secured first place on Good Data's "Drama Performer Buzzworthiness" list from the fourth week of August to the fourth week of September, and ranked second in the fifth week of September 2021. In September of the same year, he topped the Korean Business Research Institute's brand reputation ranking index. A report published by the Ministry of Culture, Sports and Tourism and KOFICE on April 18, 2022, The 2021 Big Data Utilization Hallyu Market Research, listed the keywords "Kim Seon-ho" and "Hometown Cha-Cha-Cha" as some of the most searched and mentioned globally for 2021 Korean drama.

In 2021 Gallup Korea's year-end poll, Kim Seon-ho was named Television Actor of the Year. The series also received the 2021 Good Drama of the Year award in the serial drama category from the Kim Soo-hyun Drama Art Hall, which is operated by the Cheongju Cultural Industry Promotion Foundation, with his name mentioned on the certificate. He subsequently received the Outstanding Actor Award at the 2022 Seoul International Drama Awards.

=== The "Hong Banjang" archetype in social policy ===
Scriptwriter Shin Ha-eun has described Hong Banjang as "an iconic character and part of actor Kim Joo-hyuk's legacy," noting that the name now functions as a proper noun. Since the film's release, Hong Banjang has evolved into a cultural archetype for neighborhood leaders or social workers who proactively resolve local issues. Media outlets frequently apply the moniker to real-life figures dedicated to community service. (Note: Attributed to multiple sources:)

The "Hong Banjang" archetype has also influenced public discourse regarding social welfare. During the 10th Social Economy Joint Forum in 2016, hosted by the National Social Solidarity Economy Local Government Council, the term was associated with intermediate support organizations. These entities, often called Social Economy Support Centers or Village Development Support Centers, are viewed as modern anchors for community development.

Multiple South Korean local governments have formally adopted Hong Banjang as an official name for welfare initiatives. In 2015, Donui-dong of Jongno District launched the Village Butler Project, titled Tonŭi-dong Hong Panjang (돈의동 홍반장; 'Hong Banjang of Donui-dong'). This initiative provides services such as large-scale laundry, home repairs, and hospital accompaniment for vulnerable groups. This was followed in 2019 by the Saetdeul Village Project, which employs village butlers titled 'Hong Banjang' to assist with moving and gardening in shantytown communities. By 2023, Seoul's Gangseo District established the 'OK! Hong Banjang Residential Complaints Mobile Team' to offer mobile home repair services to socially vulnerable residents.

The influence of the archetype has also extended to rural life care policies. Yeoju City's Happy Village Management Office designated its village guardians as Hong Banjang, focusing on home visitations and minor household repairs for vulnerable populations. Several other cities have branded their programs specifically as Uri tongne Hong Panjang (우리 동네 홍반장; 'Hong Banjang in Our Neighborhood'). In Suwon, the Gyeonggi Happy Village Management Office in Haenggung-dong deployed village guardians under this name to offer services in high-risk areas, including childcare, elderly care, and community monitoring. Gunsan City launched its 'Our Neighborhood Hong Banjang Mobile Social Welfare Program' in 2023. By 2024, the program had assisted 210 households through local councils and has since been recognized as a model for strengthening local welfare.

Sacheon City's Dongseo-dong Administrative Welfare Center also introduced as Uri tongne Hong Panjang (우리 동네 홍반장). Staff visit elderly residents living alone once a month to deliver rice and kimchi, check on their well-being, and provide companionship. These services include laundry assistance specifically for elderly. Following a 2023 pilot, the city expanded this resident-driven system to 14 districts. This program utilized 110 community activists to address welfare blind spots and contributed to the city's recognition in the Gyeongnam Integrated Care Evaluation.

=== The "Hong Banjang" countryside model ===
The "Hong Banjang" figure has become a model of modern countryside ideals. While large-scale farming provides a full-time income, it requires demanding, year-round labor. Alternatively, small-scale farming requires young people to juggle multiple side jobs to survive. As small villages lack the population to support specialized businesses, they need residents like Hong Banjang, who blend small-scale farming with everyday services like home repairs and neighborhood assistance and thus keeping rural communities alive. Newcomers to fishing communities are more likely to be accepted when they follow the example set by Hong Banjang and participate actively in village events while taking part in shared responsibilities. A major practical barrier is securing paejari (배자리; 'A place where ships dock to load and unload cargo within a port'). These spots are often controlled by established community rights, making them difficult for outsiders to obtain.

As interest in rural relocation has grown, kwiŏhakkyo (귀어학교; 'fishery return schools') have experienced a noticeable surge in demand, with competition rates at some institutions reaching 11 to 1. Many aspiring fishermen are in their twenties and thirties from diverse professional backgrounds, including programmers, bankers, and chefs, who seek a fresh start after experiencing corporate burnout or job loss. To cater to this demand, the Ministry of Oceans and Fisheries of South Korea relaunched its portal in December 2021 as the "Return to the Seaside Village Comprehensive Information Platform." The site consolidates resources from support centers and kwiŏhakkyo (귀어학교), providing centralized data on support programs and infrastructure to assist prospective rural residents.

=== Cross-media influence ===
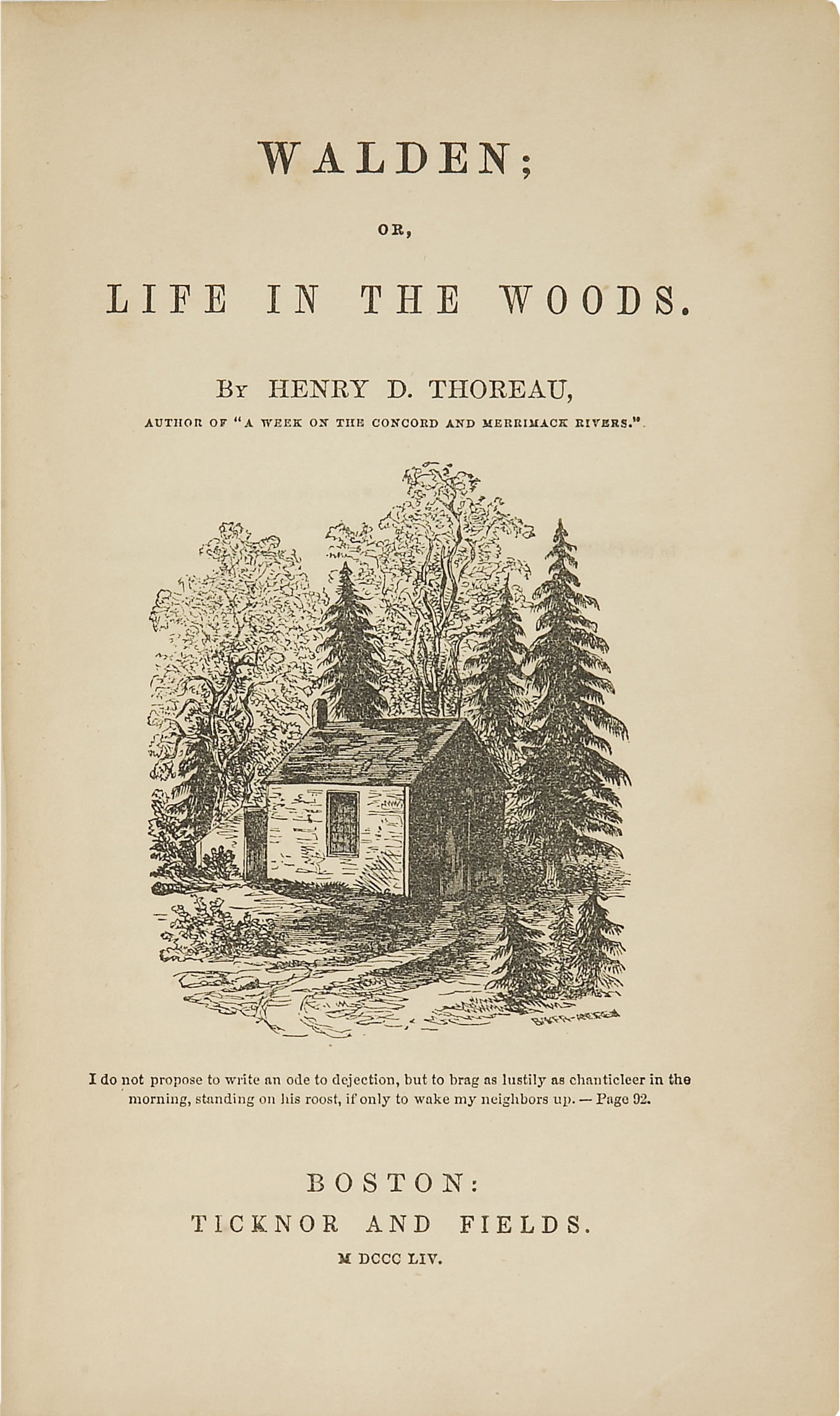
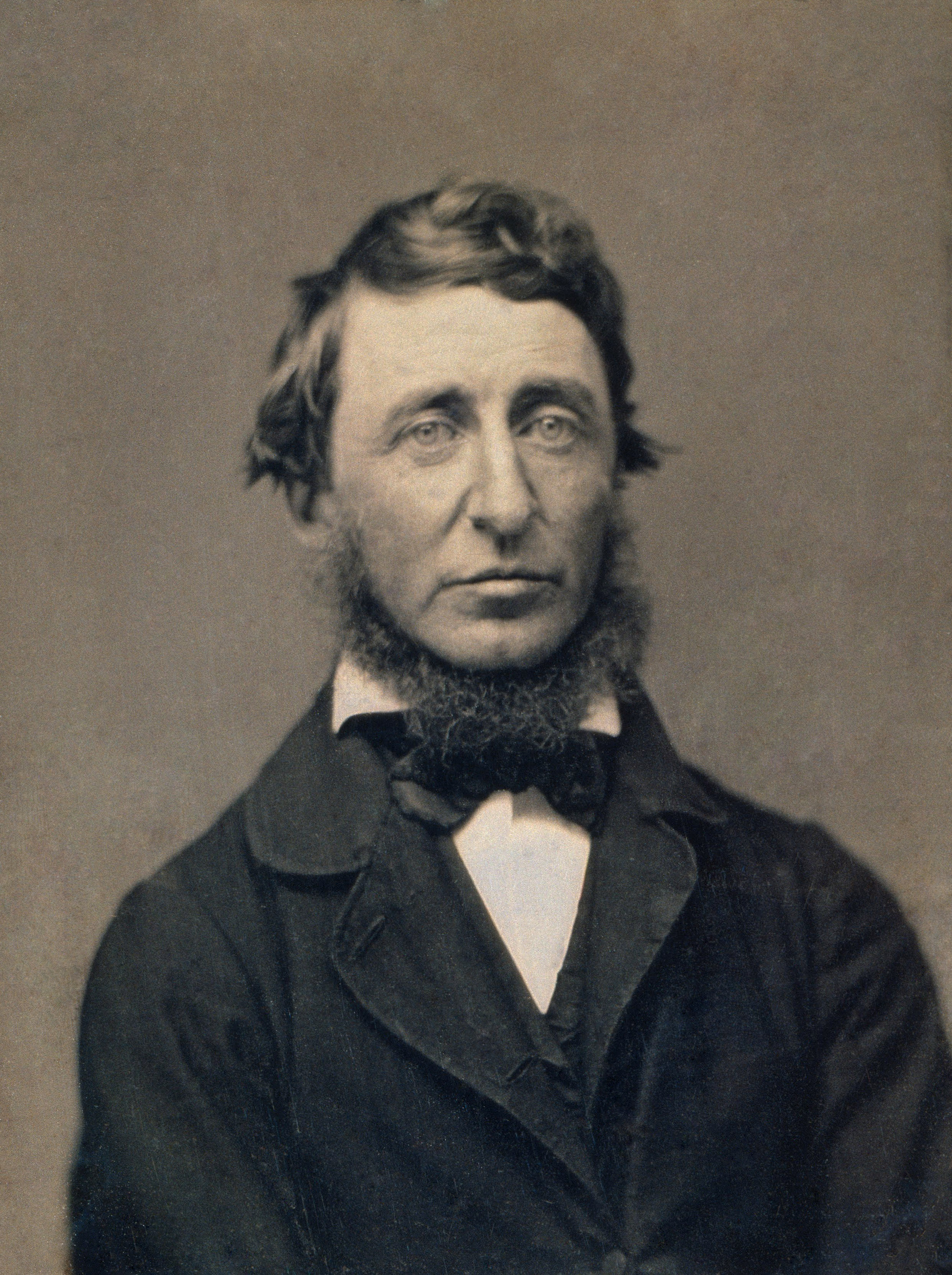
Walden Book (left) and Henry David Thoreau (right)

Several literary works featured in Hometown Cha-Cha-Cha experienced a surge in sales following their appearance. After Hong Du-sik recited Kim Haeng-sook's poem "The Gate Keeper," the 2014 poetry collection Portrait of Echo became a bestseller seven years after its release. By the second week of October 2021, the book reached second and third place on the poetry charts of Kyobo Bookstore and Yes24, respectively. The Korean translation of Henry David Thoreau's Walden, shown being read by Du-sik in episode 2 and quoted in a promotional clip, rose to 11th on the Yes24 essay bestseller list. Yes24 reported sales increases of 3,257 percent for Portrait of Echo and 369 percent for Walden following their inclusion in the series.

The central romance of the series also inspired Yael Yuzon, frontman of the Filipino rock band Sponge Cola to compose a song titled "Hometown." Yuzon described the track as a "balance of light and weight" after considering alternative titles such as "Penguins and Polar Bears." The song is his second work influenced by Kim Seon-ho's drama, following the 2020 track "Siguro Nga," which was inspired by the character Han Ji-pyeong from Start-Up.

=== The "Hallyu Pilgrimage" ===
The 2004 film Mr. Handy, Mr. Hong was filmed on Jeju Island. A primary location was Beophwan Village in Seogwipo, situated on Course 7 of the Jeju Olle Trail. This 1.3 kilometers coastal segment between Beophwan Port and World Cup Road provides views of Beomseom Island. These locations have since become tourism destinations for fans of the film and the lead actor, Kim Joo‑hyuk. While the original film established a baseline for location-based interest, the 2021 drama Hometown Cha-Cha-Cha resulted in a more extensive set-jetting tourism in Pohang. Filming locations became a frequent addition to travel itineraries, reportedly revitalizing the local commercial district and economy.

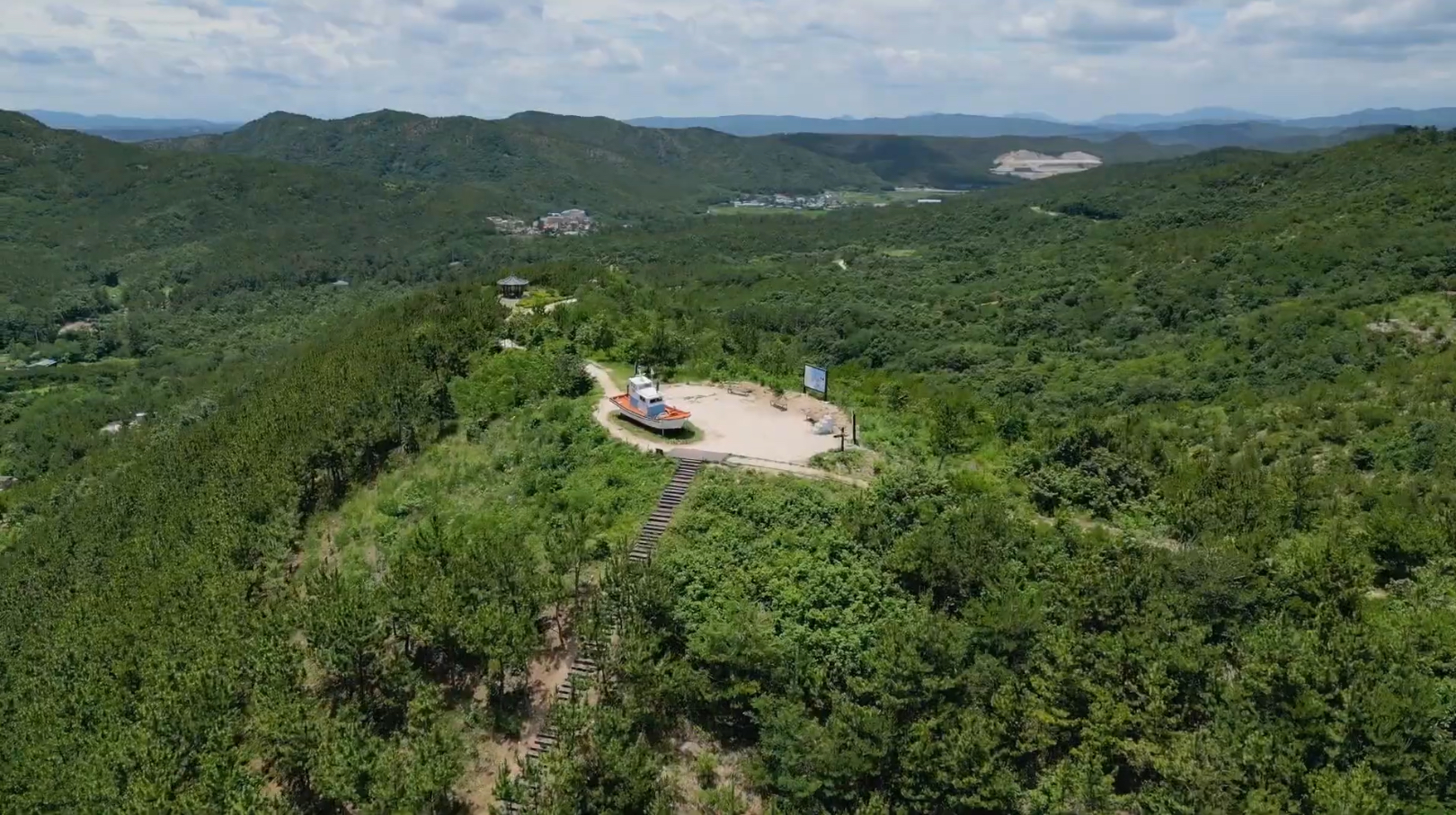
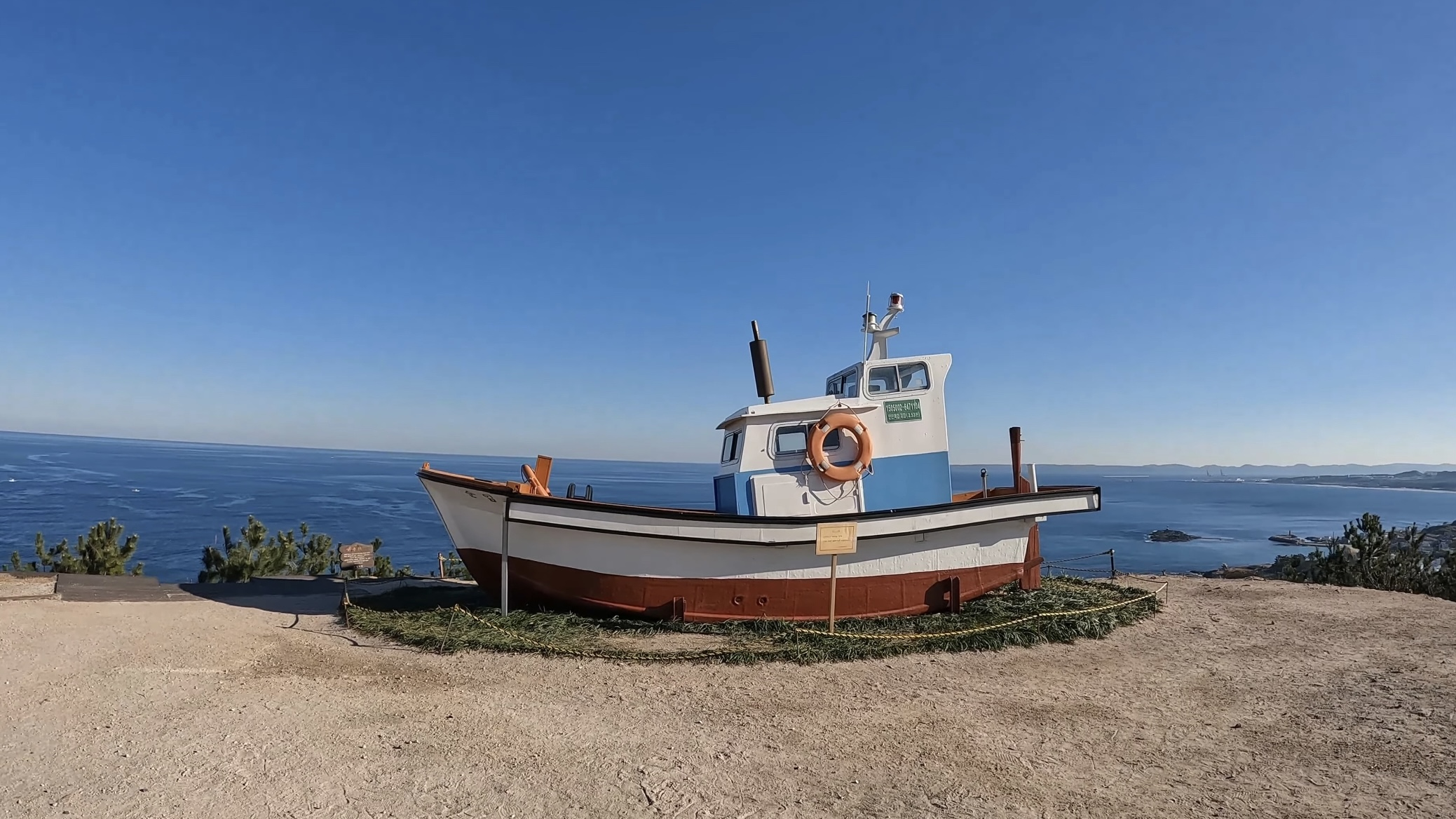
Situated atop Mugeunbong Peak, the boat of Hong Banjang continues to draw international visitors who hike up the steep 780-meter (2,560 ft) trail.

One notable example is Sabang Memorial Park in Heunghae-eup, Buk District, Pohang, which features Hong Du-sik's boat on the mountain Mugeunbong. According to Choi Young-moo of the Pohang City Tourism Marketing Team, daily visitors to the park increased from 500 on holidays to between 3,000 and 4,000 after the series aired. Cheongha Market underwent a similar transition. Originally a quiet hub of 25 shops operating on a five-day cycle, it was rebranded as "Cheongha Gongjin Market" after the fictional village's name in the series. The market now features several permanent sets, including the Squid Statue, Bora Supermarket, and the "Coffee by Day, Beer by Night" café.

These local developments were further integrated into national tourism campaigns by the Korea Tourism Organization. Following the broadcast of Hometown Cha-Cha-Cha, they partnered with Studio Dragon and LG U+ to create virtual reality content showcasing the drama's locations, made available on the LG U+ XR platform, U+DIVe, since November 24, 2021. In the same month, they also showcased the drama's filming locations on their Visit Korea website, as part of a K-Drama tour destination. In February 2023, Cheongha Gongjin Market was included in a 2023 "Hallyu Pilgrimage" promotion, highlighting 53 locations across South Korea.

The government of Pohang invested ₩1.3 billion between 2023 and 2025 to upgrade infrastructure at these landmarks. Improvements included new parking facilities, an international visitor lounge featuring the drama-themed mural, and a renovation of the Squid Statue, which was formally inaugurated on February 27, 2025, by the mayor of Pohang. Under the slogan "Pohang, a City Like a Drama," the city aims to reach 10 million annual visitors by leveraging its kdrama former filming sites.

The series also contributed to tourism in Yangju, where the Chang Ucchin Museum of Art was featured in episode 12 as one of the dating spots of Du-sik and Hye-jin. Following this episode, officials noted a rise in inquiries about the museum, attracting viewers drawn to its unique architecture and natural surroundings.
