= Mr. Handy, Mr. Hong =

Mr. Handy Mr. Hong
- Theatrical poster
- Hangul: 어디선가 누군가에 무슨 일이 생기면 틀림없이 나타난다 홍반장
- Lit.: If something happens to someone somewhere, he'll definitely show up, Hong Banjang
- RR: Eodiseonga nugungae museun iri saenggimyeon teullimeopsi natananda Hong banjang
- MR: Ŏdisŏn'ga nugun'gaë musŭn iri saenggimyŏn t'ŭllimŏpsi nat'ananda Hong panjang
- Directed by: Kang Seok-beom
- Written by: Kang Seok-beom; Shin Jeong-goo
- Screenplay by: Lee Yun-jin
- Produced by: Kim Du-chan; Seo Jeong; Song Su-geun
- Starring: Kim Joo-hyuk; Uhm Jung-hwa; Kim Ga-yeon
- Cinematography: Jang Joon-young
- Edited by: Ham Seong-won
- Music by: Lee Wook-hyeon; Song Min-goo; Seo Hyun-il
- Production company: Zenith Cinema
- Distributed by: Plenus Cinema
- Release date: March 12, 2004
- Running time: 108 minutes
- Country: South Korea
- Language: Korean

Mr Handy Mr Hong (Korean: 어디선가 누군가에 무슨 일이 생기면 틀림없이 나타난다 홍반장) is a 2004 South Korean romantic comedy. The movie's long title was inspired by the opening theme song of the Japanese anime Astroganger and is currently the second longest title for a Korean film.

Starring Kim Joo-hyeok and Uhm Jung-hwa, this film was their second project after their previous film Singles. It was released on cinema on March 12, 2004. This film got around 830,000 movie-goers.

== Plot ==
Yoon Hye-jin is a dentist who works at a big hospital in Seoul. One day, she gives a bluff resignation to her superior to defend her rights as a dentist. However, her boss accepts her resignation on the spot. Due to a rumor created by her former boss, Hye-jin is denied hospital jobs in Seoul and forced to open her own clinic. She seeks to find a perfect location for her clinic with her limited savings, and this leads her to a small village by the sea. She meets Hong Du-sik, a banjang (neighborhood chief) who makes a living doing odd jobs for 50 bucks per day.

After securing a rental home and clinic in the village, Hye-jin persuades her best friend, nurse Oh Mi-seon, to move in with her and work at her clinic. The clinic runs into rough seas at first. Stuff happens that make Hye-jin run into Du-sik all the time and everywhere.

== Cast ==
=== Main Cast ===
- Kim Joo-hyuk as Hong Banjang (Hong Du-sik)

Hong Du-sik, a 30-year-old man with a tall, handsome appearance, knows anything and can do anything. His blank past in 3-year after his military discharge makes him even more mysterious. Some say he was an interpreter at the Korea-US summit, some say he was a bodyguard for a famous singer, and some say he crossed the Atlantic Ocean by swimming alone. But one day, this multi-talented man, Captain Hong, who says even ghosts cry, gets a once-in-a-lifetime obstacle.

- Uhm Jung-hwa as Yoon Hye-jin

Yoon Hyejin lost her job because her bluff resignation was accepted on the spot while protesting for her rights as dentist. She is eventually denied a job in Seoul due to her former boss scheme. Hye-jin settles down in a small city to open her own dental clinic.

=== Supporting Cast ===
- Kim Ga-yeon as Oh Mi-seon - Hye-jin's friend and dental nurse.
- Ki Joo-bong as Chairman Yoon - Hye-jin's father
- Heo Gi-ho as Tae-ho - Chairman Yoon Driver

=== Appearance ===
- Go Se-hoon as child Yoon Hye-jin
- Kim Yong-heon as Gi-cheol
- Son Jae-gon as Constable Kang
- Jang Shin-jo as Police corporal Jin
- Noh Seung-beom as Maeng
- Choi Young-jin as Galchi
- Hwang Soo-hyeon as Nopchi
- Lee Kyung-hee as aunt owner of Hye-jin's house and clinic
- Goo Bon-im as Chinese restaurant lady
- Kim Jin-goo as Midwife grandmother
- Kang Jae-seop as Jae-su
- Lee Seon-kyu as section chief 1
- Bae Jang-soo as section chief 2
- Hong Seong-hyeon as Section chief 3
- Kim Yeong-bae as Director
- Lee Chang as broker 1
- Song Yeong-beom as broker 3
- Joo Hyo-man as grandfather 1
- Lee Bok-hee as grandfather 2
- Park Sin-beom as grandfather 3
- Im Cheon-yong as Mr. Kim
- Lee Ju-ri as Jae-soo
- Yoon Gap-soo as Jae-soo's father
- Kim Doo-chan as Ji-soo's husband
- Seok Jeong-man as Mr. Park
- Park Ji-hyeon as Bank clerk
- Hwang Ja-kyeong as Pregnant woman
- Kim Se-hee as Baby
- Jo Seong-je as fellow doctor 1
- Song Yeong-gyu as fellow doctor 2
- Lee Ho-woo as fellow doctor 3
- Kim Min-jeong as fellow doctor 4
- Jo Eun-hee as fellow doctor 5
- Oh Jeong-taek as Security room staff
- Kim Yeong-sook as Recycling middle aged woman
- Jang Dong-jik as President Park (special appearance)
- Kang Seong-pil as Driver (special appearance)
- Kim Joon-sung as Noh Do-cheol (special appearance)
- Lee Gyu-hwa as Trailer voice actor
- Seo Hye-jeong as Trailer Voice Actor

== Original soundtrack ==
Most of original soundtracks of this film was written by music director Lee Woo-hyun. There are two remakes of the famous songs of Yoo Jae-ha and Kim Kwang-seok included in the album. Both song were sung life by Kim Jo-hyuk in the film, however for the album Kim only recorded "With the mind to forget" by Kim Kwang-seok, whist "You in my arms" by Yoo Jae-ha was sung by Sing Yoo-jeong.

Hong Banjang OST

Soundtrack album by Various Artists
- Released: March 16, 2004
- Genre: Soundtrack
- Languages: Korean; English
- Labels: Kingpin Entertainment Co., Ltd.

OST
No.	Title	Artist	Length
1.	"Prologue"	Lee Woo-hyun	3:50
2.	"You in my arms" (그대 내 품에)	Sing Yoo-jeong	3:56
3.	"With the mind to forget" (잊어야 한다는 마음으로)	Kim Jo-hyuk	2:53
4.	"Wander"	Lee Woo-hyun	3:57
5.	"The Cafe"	Lee Woo-hyun	3:54
6.	"One Year"	Lee Woo-hyun	3:09
7.	"For farewell" (이별을 위해)	Lee Woo-hyun	4:14
8.	"Piano and Cello"	Lee Woo-hyun	3:17
9.	"The Happening"	Lee Woo-hyun	3:17
10.	"Aria on the G String" (G선상의 아리아)	Johann Sebastian Bach	3:13
11.	"The First Kiss"	Lee Woo-hyun	3:25
12.	"Recollection"	Lee Woo-hyun	4:00
13.	"Memory"	Lee Woo-hyun	4:00
14.	"Reunion"	Lee Woo-hyun	4:00
15.	"With the mind that I should forget" ((잊어야 한다는 마음으로) Jazz Version)	Lee Woo-hyun	4:00
16.	"Epilogue"	Lee Woo-hyun	4:00

== Production ==
=== Character development ===
The character Hong Du-sik, widely known as Hong Banjang, was originally created by screenwriters Kang Seok-beom and Shin Jeong-goo for the 2004 film Mr. Handy, Mr. Hong. Produced by Zenith Entertainment, the film was the directorial debut of Kang Seok-beom. The film's full Korean title, Ŏdisŏn'ga nugun'gaë musŭn iri saenggimyŏn t'ŭllimŏpsi nat'ananda Hong panjang (어디선가 누군가에 무슨 일이 생기면 틀림없이 나타난다 홍반장; 'If something happens to someone somewhere, Hong Banjang will surely appear'), holds the record for the second-longest title in South Korean cinema history. This title pays homage to the Japanese anime Astroganger, establishing Hong Banjang as a neighborhood hero who arrives whenever help is needed. His "can-do-everything" trait frequently earned him comparisons to MacGyver.

=== Casting ===
On October 10, 2003, it was announced that Kim Joo-hyeok and Uhm Jung-hwa had been cast in a lead role in Mr. Handy, Mr. Hong.

=== Filming ===
It was also reported that the filming will start on October 25, 2003. On January 14, 2004, filming concluded after three months, with locations including Seoul, Jeju, and Busan. On March 4, the director and main casts attend the premiere and the press release event at the Daehan cinema.

== Release ==
The film premiered in South Korea on March 12, 2004. In August 2005, it was screened in Nagoya, Sapporo, Tokyo and Osaka, as part of Cinema Korea 2005. It was an event to introduce Korean Cinema to Japanese fans.

== Reception ==
Kim Joo-hyuk's portrayal of Hong Banjang in his first leading film role, Mr. Handy, Mr. Hong, is frequently cited as a career-defining performance. Executive producer of the film, Kim Doo-chan dubbed him as "the best romantic comedy actor" and "Korea's Hugh Grant." Although the film was not a major box-office success, critic Lee Saeng-heon praised his performance, noting that it relied heavily on personal charisma and warmth. In a 2017 posthumous survey, Hong Banjang was voted as his most memorable role.

== Impact ==
=== Tourism ===
The film Mr. Handy, Mr. Hong was filmed on Jeju Island. A primary location was Beophwan Village in Seogwipo, situated on Course 7 of the Jeju Olle Trail. This 1.3 kilometers coastal segment between Beophwan Port and World Cup Road provides views of Beomseom Island. These locations have since become tourism destinations for fans of the film and the lead actor, Kim Joo‑hyuk.

=== The "Hong Banjang" model for young people returning to countryside ===
The "Hong Banjang" figure has become a meaningful symbol of countryside ideals, encouraging young adults to consider returning to rural life. However, moving to the countryside comes with major challenges. Young farmer Kim Hyun-hee notes that while large-scale farming provides a full income, it requires demanding, year-round labor. Alternatively, small-scale farming requires young people to juggle multiple side jobs to survive. She adds that as small villages lack the population to support specialized businesses, they need versatile problem solvers like Hong Banjang. By blending small-scale farming with everyday services like home repairs and neighborhood assistance, these multi-skilled residents fill the crucial gaps that keep rural communities alive.

=== The "Hong Banjang" archetype in social policy ===
Scriptwriter Shin Ha-eun has described Hong Banjang as "an iconic character and part of actor Kim Joo-hyuk's legacy," noting that the name now functions as a proper noun. Since the film's release, "Hong Banjang" has evolved into a cultural archetype for neighborhood leaders or social workers who proactively resolve local issues. Media outlets frequently apply the moniker to real-life figures dedicated to community service. (Note: Attributed to multiple sources:)

The "Hong Banjang" archetype has also influenced public discourse regarding social welfare. During the 10th Social Economy Joint Forum in 2016, hosted by the National Social Solidarity Economy Local Government Council, the term was used to describe intermediate support organizations. These entities, such as Social Economy Support Centers and Village Development Support Centers, are viewed as modern anchors for community development.

Multiple South Korean local governments have formally adopted "Hong Banjang" as an official name for welfare initiatives. In 2015, the Donui-dong district of Jongno-gu launched the Village Butler Project, titled "Donui-dong Hong Banjang." This initiative provides services such as large-scale laundry, home repairs, and hospital accompaniment for vulnerable groups. This was followed in 2019 by the Saetdeul Village Project, which employs village butlers titled "Hong Banjang" to assist with moving and gardening in shantytown communities. By 2023, Seoul's Gangseo District established the "OK! Hong Banjang Residential Complaints Mobile Team" to offer mobile home repair services to socially vulnerable residents.

The influence of the archetype has also extended to rural life care policies. Yeoju City's Happy Village Management Office designated its village guardians as "Hong Banjang," focusing on home visitations and minor household repairs for vulnerable populations. Several other cities have branded their programs specifically as "Our Neighborhood Hong Banjang" (우리 동네 홍반장). In Suwon, the Gyeonggi Happy Village Management Office in Haenggung-dong deployed village guardians under this name to offer services in high-risk areas, including childcare, elderly care, and community monitoring. Gunsan City launched its "Our Neighborhood Hong Banjang Mobile Social Welfare Program" in 2023. By 2024, the program had assisted 210 households through local councils and has since been recognized as a model for strengthening local welfare.

Sacheon City's Dongseo-dong Administrative Welfare Center also introduced "Our Neighborhood Hong Banjang." Staff visit elderly residents living alone once a month to deliver rice and kimchi, check on their well-being, and provide companionship. These services include laundry assistance specifically for elderly. Following a 2023 pilot, the city expanded this resident-driven system to 14 districts. This program utilized 110 community activists to address welfare blind spots and contributed to the city's recognition in the Gyeongnam Integrated Care Evaluation.

=== Adaptation ===
Plans to adapt this film into drama series were first announced on December 21, 2020, under the working title of Hong Banjang (홍반장). The adaptation was written by Shin Ha-eun as her comeback after co-writing the 2019 drama The Crowned Clown. It was also announced that Kim Seon-ho and Shin Min-a were being offered the lead roles. On April 2, 2021, it was officially announced that Yoo Je-won would be directing the drama, literally translated as Seaside Village Cha-Cha-Cha (갯마을 차차차). At the same time, Kim Seon-ho and Shin Min-a were confirmed as main leads, and Lee Sang-yi was offered a role.

Hometown Cha-Cha-Cha (갯마을 차차차) was aired from August 28 to October 17, 2021, on tvN's Saturdays and Sundays in the 21:00 (KST). It is also available for streaming on Netflix.

== Accolades ==
Award	Year	Category	Nominated work	Result	Ref.
Golden Cinematography Awards	2004	Special Award	Uhm Jung-hwa	Won	
41st Grand Bell Awards	2004	Best Supporting Actress	Kim Ga-yeon	Won	
