= Shin Ha-eun =

South Korean television screenwriter

- 신하은
- Born: South Korea
- Education: Broadcasting Writers Education Center
- Occupation: Screenwriter
- Years active: 2017–present
- Employer: Studio Dragon
- Organization(s): Korea Television and Radio Writers Association (KTRWA)
- Notable work: Hometown Cha-Cha-Cha
- Honours: Commendation from the Minister of Culture, Sports and Tourism

Korean name
- Hangul: 신하은
- RR: Sin Haeun
- MR: Sin Haŭn

Shin Ha-eun (Korean: 신하은) is a South Korean television screenwriter best known for her globally successful Netflix original series, Hometown Cha-Cha-Cha (2021). She has also worked as a co-author for two tvN dramas, Argon (2017) and The Crowned Clown (2019).

Shin gained recognition as a graduate and winner of the CJENM O'PEN Content Creator Project. Her winning script was produced into an episode of tvN 2018 Drama Stage Anthology, also known as Collection of Poems.

== Career ==
=== 2017 CJENM O'PEN Content Creator Project ===
Shin initially aspired to be a poet and pursued this passion by studying Korean Literature in college. After completing her undergraduate studies, she further explored her interest in modern poetry by enrolling in graduate school. However, when her graduate advisor retired and she found herself in a temporary hiatus, Shin's aspirations shifted towards becoming a drama writer. Motivated by this new goal, she decided to enroll in a writer's education institute to pave her way into this career path. Specifically, Shin honed her writing skills at The Broadcasting Writers Education Center in Seoul, which was established in 1988 by the Korea TV and Radio Writers Association (KTRWA). (Note: The Korea Television and Radio Writers Association (KTRWA) is an association for South Korean broadcasting writers who create content for radio and television, including shows, news programs, documentaries, and translated scripts. Established in 1988, the association aims to protect the rights of broadcasting writers, promote cultural development, and facilitate the exchange of ideas among writers. KTRWA plays a key role in safeguarding copyrights and other rights of broadcasting writers. Approximately 3,700 members from diverse fields such as variety programs, documentaries, dramas, radio, translation, and entertainment are part of the association.)

Shin is a current member of the KTRWA and works as a television screenwriter. Her name and copyrighted works can be found in the KTRWA's online database, showcasing her contributions to the field.

In 2017, Shin applied to O'PEN Writer Contest. (Note: O'PEN is CJ E&M's collaboration with its drama production subsidiaries Studio Dragon and CJ Cultural Foundation to provide an open creative space and opportunity for those who dream of becoming a pen (a writer): television and film scriptwriters. This is a creative development and debut support project that supports the entire process from script planning and development, video production, organization and business matching. CJ E&M boosts investment ₩13 billion (season 1) (approx. US$18 million) to grow drama and movie writers.) These writers were recruited through an open call that took place between January and March of that year. Over the course of the two-month contest period, approximately 3,700 aspiring writers submitted scripts for dramas or films. These submissions underwent two to three rounds of judging by dozens of industry professionals. Ultimately, the jury selected 35 talented new writers, including 20 drama writers and 15 movie writers. Among them was Shin, who was recognized for her exceptional writing talent and potential.

"Competition for competition is fierce as word of mouth among aspiring writers spreads the various debut support programs and networks of field workers in O'PEN. I can't feel this moment as I'm fulfilling my dream of writing. I will meet viewers with good works in the future."

— Shin on Anthology (2017)

Just two months after winning the O'PEN contest, Shin received a love call from Lee Yoon-jung, personally inviting her to join the writing team for her upcoming drama. Shin co-authored tvN Argon alongside Joon Young-shin and Joo Won-gyu. Directed by Lee Yoon-jung, this eight-episode mini-series revolves around Team Argon, an investigative television program dedicated to uncovering the truth. The show delves into the dynamic between Kim Baek-jin (played by Kim Joo-hyuk), a perfectionist news anchor, reporter, and leader of Argon, and Lee Yeon-hwa (played by Chun Woo-hee), a temporary employee with aspirations of becoming a reporter.

Argon was broadcast on the cable channel tvN every Monday and Tuesday at 22:50 (KST) from September 4 to 26, 2017. The drama garnered positive reviews for its intelligent writing, compelling performances, and realistic depiction of the media industry. Shin's valuable contribution to the writing team received widespread acclaim, solidifying her reputation as a skilled and promising screenwriter.

In November 2017, tvN made an announcement confirming the casting of Shin Eun-soo and Lee Jae-won as the female and male protagonists, respectively, for Shin's one-act drama titled Anthology (Collection of Poem). This project marked a reunion between Shin and director Lee Yoon-jeong, who previously collaborated on Argon. Anthology was aired on January 6, 2018, as the sixth installment out of ten episodes in 2018 tvN Drama Stage. (Note: Drama Stage (Korean: 드라마 스테이지; RR: Deurama Seuteiji) is a South Korean weekly television program that features ten one-act dramas, which is similar to KBS2's Drama Special. The short plays were created by writers selected from "O'PEN Drama Storyteller Exhibition" held by CJ E&M, and these are adapted as one-act dramas produced by its subsidiary Studio Dragon in partnership with other companies. It aired on tvN every Saturday at midnight.)

=== Debut as drama writer ===
"Personally, I think the most important thing for an artist is experience. O'PEN broadened the spectrum of that experience. Through special lectures by writers and directors who created masterpieces of the time, their insights were also shared. The process of creating a work for an artist is like running a marathon. When I was tired and exhausted, O'PEN acted as a good running mate."

— Shin on O'PEN (2022)

CJ E&M announced in April 2018 that their first four 2017 O'PEN writers had recently signed a writing contract with leading domestic drama production houses. Among them was Shin Ha-eun, who signed a contract with Studio Dragon to write a mini-series consisting of 16 to a maximum of 32 episodes. This marked her official debut as a drama writer.

In November 2019, CJ E&M announced that three of their 2017 O'PEN graduateds would enter the industry by co-authoring drama series scheduled to be aired on terrestrial and cable television. Alongside senior writer Kim Seon-deok, Shin Ha-eun co-authored tvN drama The Crowned Clown. This historical drama, spanning sixteen episodes, was a remake of the 2012 film Masquerade. The series revolves around the tale of a Joseon King and his doppelganger, clown whom he places on the throne to navigate the intense power struggles plaguing the royal court.

=== First project as main writer ===
Shin Ha-eun's first project as the main writer was the 2021 remake of the film Mr. Handy, Mr. Hong (2004). The series was first announced on December 21, 2020, under the working title Hong Banjang (홍반장), with Shin Min-a and Kim Seon-ho offered the lead roles. The final English working title was decided as Hometown Cha-Cha-Cha, which reflects the drama's storyline about a love story between a realist dentist, Yoon Hye-jin (played by Shin Min-a), and an all-rounder, Hong Banjang (played by Kim Seon-ho), set in his hometown of Gongjin. The series aired on the cable channel tvN from August 2021 to October 2021 on weeend and was subsequently made available for streaming on Netflix.

"I wanted to say that in these days when emotional distance is difficult to get close, nevertheless, love still exists between people." It's a drama, and the reason why such a story was able to become popular all over the world is probably because it was based on people's mind."

— Shin on Hometown Cha-Cha-Cha (2021)

Promoted as healing romance drama, Hometown Cha-Cha-Cha received favorable reviews from domestic and foreign viewers. It entered the list of the highest-rated series on cable television history. It ranked first place during its entire run for eight weeks, and the last episode achieved 12.665% nationwide rating, with over 3.2 million views. Hometown Cha-Cha-Cha became one of Netflix's most-watched non-English television shows. According to FlixPatrol, (Note: FlixPatrol is a portal that provides VOD charts and streaming ratings worldwide, includes the Netflix charts (Netflix TOP 10 or what is Trending on Netflix), iTunes charts, Amazon Prime charts and HBO charts. These charts are based on the official trending or the most popular movies and the most popular TV shows on VOD. TOP 10 lists are updated daily.) the series placed number 8th on its global chart. It also became one of Netflix's most-watched non-English television shows, and one of its longest-running hits as it spent 16 weeks in global top ten ranking in more than 20 countries. It also remained on Netflix's Top 10 Chart for television shows for more than two months from its last episode.

"I like it when people gather and it's crowded. Let's eat together, laugh, and talk. I think that's all life." "Life is not a mathematical formula. It's hard to calculate like calculus and there's no right answer. It's just that the problem was given and I decided to solve it like this." "Change your perspective a little bit. You know what? Life will roll in a new direction." "There's still plenty of time. Why are you so chased? Let's go slowly. Look at that mountain over there." "I love it now." You've eaten a lot of old Manchi (as good as it is), you've seen a lot of good scenery, and you've got people. How could I be happier than that?"

— Shin in Cine21 Interview (2023)

On December 21, 2020, the Kim Soo-hyun Drama Art Hall, operated by the Cheongju City Culture Industry Promotion Foundation, selected Hometown Cha-Cha-Cha as the '2021 Good Drama of the Year'. The certificate of award listed the names of the main cast as well as Shin Ha-eun as the writer and Yoo Je-won as the director. The drama was chosen by both a viewer evaluation team and an expert group and was praised as a 'K-healing drama' that appeared at a time when sensational genre content was prevalent. It was loved by both domestic and foreign audiences.

On February 15, 2022, CJ ENM announced that it had signed an audio content partnership agreement with 'Willa'. As the first project, the contents of 23 storytellers from O'PEN will be produced as an audio drama and sequentially presented through Willa starting in June 2022. Among the works selected to be produced as audio dramas is Shin's Anthology which was originally broadcast in 2018.

As a result of the success of Hometown Cha-Cha-Cha as a representative hallyu content, Shin was invited to give a special lecture on December 8, 2022, at the Korea Arts Center (KAC), hosted by the Broadcasting Writer and Creative Art Department. During the lecture, Shin shared practical tips on creating materials for dramas, such as selecting materials that are advantageous for production, creating compelling characters, and emphasizing the importance of the first scene. She also provided attendees with a variety of information on becoming a drama writer, including the reasons and opportunities for pursuing this career path. The lecture was well-received by attendees, who appreciated Shin's insights and expertise in the field of screenwriting. The event further solidified Shin's reputation as a respected and influential figure in the Korean drama industry.

"A sense of speed is important for drama writers, and you need to know how to write quickly." "I recommend starting with a one-act play and challenging yourself to write a mini-series." conveyed energy."

— Shin in KAC special lecture (2022)

On December 14, the Ministry of Culture, Sports, and Tourism, led by Minister Park Bo-gyun, in collaboration with the Korea Creative Content Agency, directed by Director Cho Hyun-rae, held the '2022 Korea Content Awards Ceremony' at COEX to recognize outstanding content officials and excellent content that contributed to making Korea shine in the global content industry. At the 14th edition of the Korea Contents Awards Ceremony, 36 awards were presented to works and individuals who have made significant contributions to the Korean content industry and provided emotional and joyful experiences to audiences. Shin was among the recipients, receiving the Minister's Commendation for her contribution to the development of the broadcasting and video industry through Hometown Cha-Cha-Cha.

The awarding body recognized Shin's potential as a talented screenwriter for her portrayal of the conflict, love, and growth of various characters in a small fishing village in of Hometown Cha-Cha-Cha. The drama received overwhelming support from the Asian region through Netflix and consistently ranked among the global top 10 during its airing. Additionally, the drama contributed to revitalizing the local economy, with the main location of Pohang becoming a beloved tourist destination. Shin's recognition at the awards ceremony further cemented her status as a respected and influential figure in the Korean content industry, and her work on of Hometown Cha-Cha-Cha was acknowledged as a significant contribution to the growth and development of the industry as a whole.

== Works ==
=== Television series ===
Key
†	Denotes television productions that have not yet been released

Year	Title		Director	Note	Ref.
Year	English	Korean	Director	Note	Ref.
2017	Argon	아르곤	Lee Yoon-jung	Co-writer (with Joon Young-shin and Joo Won-gyu)	
2018	Drama Stage: "Anthology"	문집	Lee Yoon-jung		
2019	The Crowned Clown	왕이 된 남자	Kim Hee-won	Co-writer (with Kim Seon-deok)	
2021	Hometown Cha-Cha-Cha	갯마을 차차차	Yoo Je-won	Based on Mr. Handy, Mr. Hong by Kang Seok-beom and Shin Jung-goo	
2024	Love Next Door	엄마친구아들	Yoo Je-won		
TBA	A Foreign Embassy in Korea †	주한이국대사관	Bae Hyun-jin		

=== Audio drama ===
Year	Title		Producer	Ref.
Year	English	Korean	Producer	Ref.
2022	Anthology	문집	CJ E&M and Willa	

=== Scriptbook ===
Year	Title		Publisher	Published Date	ISBN
Year	English	Korean	Publisher	Published Date	ISBN
2019	The Man Who Became King Script Book 1	왕이 된 남자 1	Artificial Man Co., Ltd	July 11, 2019	979-1-1888-5050-1
2019	The Man Who Became King Script Book 2	왕이 된 남자 2	Artificial Man Co., Ltd	July 11, 2019	979-1-1888-5051-8
2021	Hometown Cha-Cha-Cha Vol 1: Shin Ha-Eun Scriptbook	갯마을 차차차 1: 신하은 대본집 신하은	Booklog Company Co., Ltd	November 8, 2021	979-1-1680-3004-6
2021	Hometown Cha-Cha-Cha Vol 2: Shin Ha-Eun Scriptbook	갯마을 차차차 2: 신하은 대본집 신하은	Booklog Company Co., Ltd	November 8, 2021	979-1-1680-3005-3

== Accolades ==
=== Awards and nominations ===
Award ceremony	Year	Category	Recipient	Result	Ref.
O'PEN Writer Contest	2019	Best Writer	Anthology	Won	
Kim Soo-hyun Drama Art Hall (Note: Kim Soo-hyun Drama Art Hall managed by Cheongju Cultural Industry Promotion Foundation is drama literature center, an exhibition space of drama writer Kim Soo-Hyun and her works)	2021	Serial Drama Category – Good Drama of the Year	Hometown Cha-Cha-Cha (Note: Drama's network, director, writer and main actors are recognized in the award certificates, with tvN, Yoo Je-won, Shin Min-a, Kim Seon-ho, Lee Sang-yi, Gong Min-jeung, and Kim Young-ok)	Won	

=== State honors ===
Country	Award Ceremony	Year	Honor	Ref.
South Korea	14th Korean Content Awards (Note: Honors are given at the Korean Content Awards (대한민국 콘텐츠 대상) arranged by the Korea Creative Content Agency and hosted by the Ministry of Culture, Sports and Tourism. The 2022 Korea Content Awards Ceremony, which started in 2009 and celebrated its 14th this year, aims to inspire pride in the content industry and develop the Korean cultural content industry by discovering and awarding contributors and excellent content that have contributed to the development of the content industry in 2022. It is a place to promote. The winners (works) of honor, which are recommended through the website of the Korea Creative Content Agency (www.kocca.kr) and announced through careful examination by experts and three-step verification, play a leading role in shining the Korean content industry in the world.)	2022	Minister of Culture, Sports and Tourism Commendation for Contribution to the development of the broadcasting and video industry	

=== Listicles ===
Publisher	Year	Listicle	Placement	Ref.
Cine21	2023	22 Writers	Shortlisted	
