= Korea.net =

South Korean government portal

- Website type: e-Government
- Available in: Arabic, Chinese, English, French, German, Japanese, Russian, Spanish, Indonesian and Vietnamese
- Website: korea.net
- Commercial: No
- Current status: Online

Korea.net or KOREA.net is an official web portal of the South Korean government.

== Description ==
The predecessor to the service was called "Korea Window" (코리아윈도우), which was established in 1995. Korea.net was established in September 1999.

Korea.net is operated by the Korean Culture and Information Service. As of 2025, it is available in Arabic, Chinese, English, French, German, Japanese, Russian, Spanish, Indonesian and Vietnamese. The website's information is sourced from honorary journalists, eight of whom won an award at the K Wave Festival 2023. It had 539 honorary reporters from 73 countries in April 2019. In 2020, it had 2,154 reporters from 104 countries, its largest ever cohort. The website was redesigned in 2019. It had 18.25 million visitors in 2013 and 22.78 million in 2018.

The website is meant to share information about Korea internationally, in other languages.

== See also ==
- VisitKorea.or.kr – website of the Korea Tourism Organization
- GOV.UK
- USA.gov
