= Love Next Door =

2024 South Korean television series

- Promotional poster
- Hangul: 엄마친구아들
- Lit.: Mom's Friend's Son
- RR: Eomma chingu adeul
- MR: Ŏmma ch'in'gu adŭl
- Genre: Romantic comedy
- Written by: Shin Ha-eun
- Directed by: Yoo Je-won
- Starring: Jung Hae-in; Jung So-min
- Music by: Lim Ha-young
- Country of origin: South Korea
- Original language: Korean
- No. of episodes: 16

Production
- Executive producers: Lee Young-ok (CP); Han So-jin (CP)
- Producers: Jang Kyung-ik; Yoo Sang-won; Jo Moon-joo; Kim Nu-ri; Lee Sang-hee
- Cinematography: Yoo Hyuk-joon; Hyeon Seung-hoon
- Editors: Kim In-young; Lee Soo-yong
- Running time: 70–80 minutes
- Production companies: Studio Dragon; The Modori

Original release
- Network: tvN
- Release: August 17 – October 6, 2024

Love Next Door (Korean: 엄마친구아들) is a 2024 South Korean television series written by Shin Ha-eun, directed by Yoo Je-won, and starring Jung Hae-in and Jung So-min. It aired on tvN from August 17, to October 6, 2024, every Saturday and Sunday at 21:20 (KST). It is also available for streaming on Netflix in selected regions.

== Synopsis ==
Love Next Door is a story of a woman who lives the perfect life abroad, being employed by one of the best companies in the world and engaged to an international lawyer. She suddenly returns to Korea. Her mother's friend's son, who is one of her childhood friends, is a top architect in Korea.

== Cast and characters ==
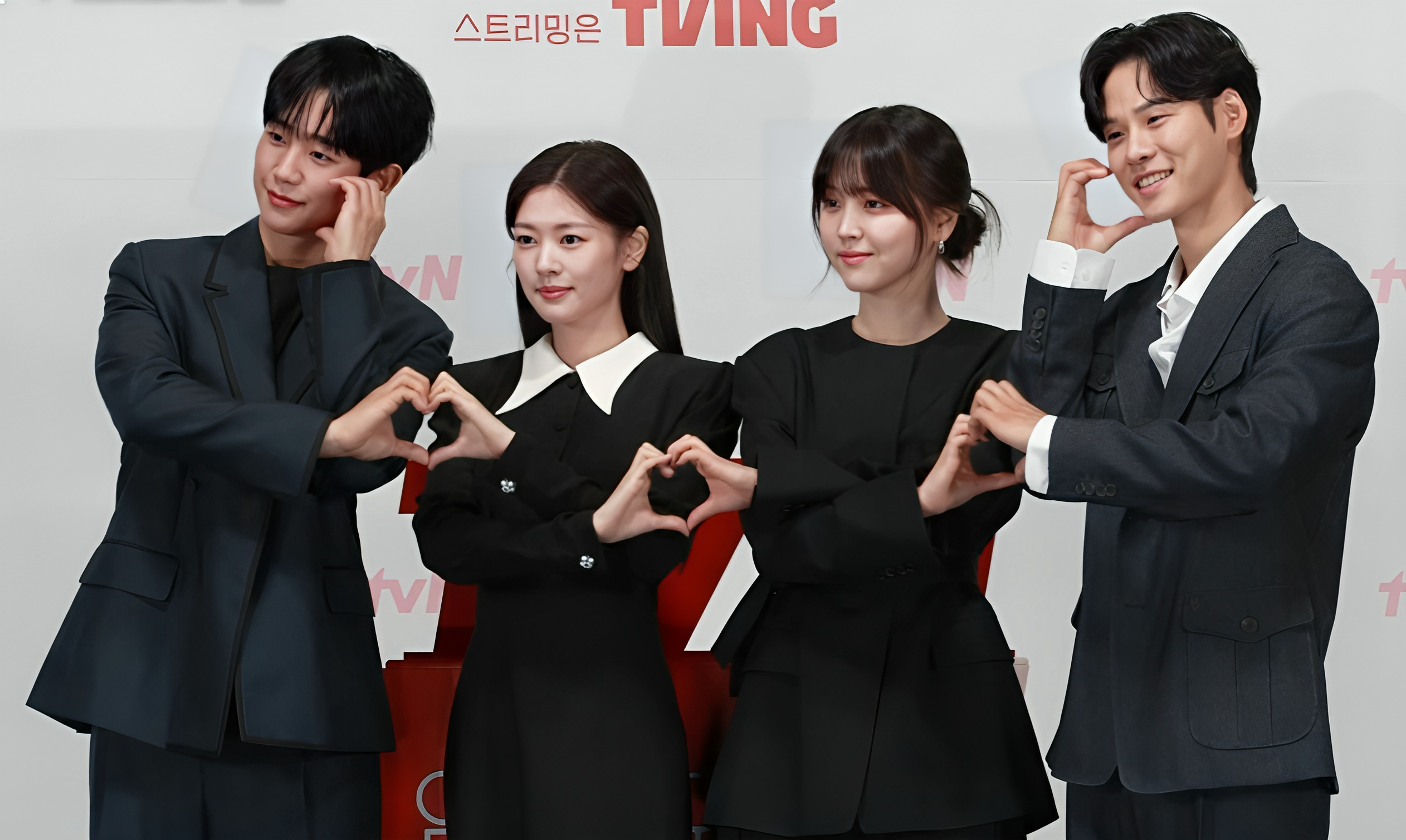
L to R: Jung Hae-in, Jung So-min, Kim Ji-eun, and Yoon Ji-on at the press conference in August 2024

=== Main ===
- Jung Hae-in as Choi Seung-hyo
  - Cho Yeo-jun as young Choi Seung-hyo

Seung-hyo is the son of Seok-ryu's mother's friend. A young architect who is attracting attention and the CEO of "the Architecture Atelier In", he is loved by everyone due to his perfect appearance and personality. The only dark past in his life is Bae Seok-ryu.

- Jung So-min as Bae Seok-ryu
  - Oh Eun-seo as young Bae Seok-ryu

A product manager of a global conglomerate called Greip, she suddenly breaks down one day and returns to her hometown to reboot her life.

- Kim Ji-eun as Jeong Mo-eum

Mo-eum is Seok-ryu and Seung-hyo's childhood friend who knows the dark history of the two better than anyone else. She is a 119 paramedic overflowing with passion and justice. Having dreamed of becoming a heroine since childhood, Mo-eum takes great pride in saving people's lives.

- Yoon Ji-on as Kang Dan-ho

Dan-ho is a field-oriented reporter who only pursues facts. Strong in conviction and responsibility, he meets unexpected changes as he moves next door to Mo-eum's family.

=== Supporting ===
- Park Ji-young as Na Mi-sook, Seok-ryu's mother who has a blunt and strong lifestyle.
- Jo Han-chul as Bae Geun-sik, Seok-ryu's father who runs a small snack restaurant in the neighborhood.
- Jang Young-nam as Seo Hye-sook, Seung-hyo's mother who works at the Ministry of Foreign Affairs and loves her work a lot.
- Lee Seung-joon as Choi Kyung-jong, a professor of emergency medicine and Seung-hyo's father.
- Jeon Seok-ho as Yoon Myung-woo, co-CEO of "the Architecture Atelier In" and Seung-hyo's college senior.
- Kim Geum-soon as Do Jae-sook, Mo-eum's mother who is a local problemsolver.
- Han Ye-ju as Bang In-sook a woman with a lot of inner anger.
- Lee Seung-hyub as Bae Dong-jin, Seok-ryu's younger brother who dreams of becoming a health trainer.
- Shim So-young as Lee Na-yeon, employee of "the Architecture Atelier In".
- Seo Ji-hye as Jang Tae-Hui

Seung-hyo's ex-girlfriend.

- Lee Ji-hae as Hwang Yeong-in

Dan-ho's boss at work, the head of the social affairs department of Cheongwoo Ilbo.

- Han Joon-woo as Song Hyeon-jun, Seok-ryu's ex-fiancé.
- Lee Si-hyung as Park Jung-woo, chief of Hyereung 119 Safety Center Paramedic.

=== Special appearances ===
- Roh Yoon-seo as herself
- Lee Bong-ryun as Im Kyung-ran

== Production ==
=== Development ===
In August 2023, the series was developed under the working title Mom's Friend's Son. Director Yoo Je-won and writer Shin Ha-eun, who previously worked on Hometown Cha-Cha-Cha (2021), reunited for the series.

=== Casting ===
In November 2023, Jung Hae-in and Jung So-min were in talks for the lead roles; both of their agencies stated they were positively considering the offers. The next month, Jung Hae-in had taken on the role of Choi Seung-hyo. In January 2024, Jung So-min confirmed her role as Bae Seok-ryu. On March 8, 2024, Kim Ji-eun confirmed her participation. On March 13, Yoon Ji-on also confirmed his appearance, and the complete cast of the drama was announced.

== Release ==
Love Next Door premiered on tvN on August 17, 2024, every weekend at 21:20 (KST). The series is also available for streaming exclusively on Netflix.

== Original soundtrack ==
=== Part 1 ===
Released on August 18, 2024
No.	Title	Lyrics	Music	Artist	Length
1.	"Any Day With You"	Muzie; Jeon Chae-eon	Muzie; SpaceCowboy; Jade; Jeon	Muzie	4:11
2.	"Any Day With You" (Inst.)		Muzie; SpaceCowboy; Jade; Jeon		4:11
Total length:					8:22}

=== Part 2 ===
Released on September 1, 2024
No.	Title	Lyrics	Music	Artist	Length
1.	"What are We"	Ogi (Galatika *)	Whyminsu; Okhan Uenver	Ha Sung-woon	3:37
2.	"What are We" (Inst.)		Whyminsu; Uenver		3:37
Total length:					7:14

=== Part 3 ===
Released on September 8, 2024
No.	Title	Lyrics	Music	Artist	Length
1.	"Reaching for You"	Flum3n; Iris (MonoTree)	Flum3n; Iris; Sam Carter (MonoTree); Chegim	Zerobaseone	3:25
2.	"Reaching for You" (Inst.)		Flum3n; Iris; Carter; Chegim		3:25
Total length:					6:50

== Viewership ==
Love Next Door : South Korea viewers per episode (millions)

Season	Episode number																Average
Season	1	2	3	4	5	6	7	8	9	10	11	12	13	14	15	16	Average
1	1.296	1.605	1.143	1.793	1.334	1.728	1.073	1.722	1.170	1.535	1.511	1.968	1.333	1.750	1.453	2.095	1.532

Source: Audience measurement performed nationwide by Nielsen Korea.

Average TV viewership ratings
Ep.	Original broadcast date	Average audience share (Nielsen Korea)	
Ep.	Original broadcast date	Nationwide	Seoul
1	August 17, 2024	4.899% (1st)	5.854% (1st)
2	August 18, 2024	5.977% (1st)	6.656% (1st)
3	August 24, 2024	4.276% (1st)	4.789% (1st)
4	August 25, 2024	6.581% (1st)	7.233% (1st)
5	August 31, 2024	4.760% (1st)	5.249% (1st)
6	September 1, 2024	6.788% (1st)	7.627% (1st)
7	September 7, 2024	3.978% (1st)	4.426% (1st)
8	September 8, 2024	6.472% (1st)	7.489% (1st)
9	September 14, 2024	4.545% (1st)	5.254% (1st)
10	September 15, 2024	5.547% (1st)	5.678% (1st)
11	September 21, 2024	5.981% (1st)	6.515% (1st)
12	September 22, 2024	7.348%(1st)	8.270%(1st)
13	September 28, 2024	5.410% (1st)	5.857% (1st)
14	September 29, 2024	7.110% (1st)	8.179% (1st)
15	October 5, 2024	6.065% (1st)	6.987% (1st)
16	October 6, 2024	8.458% (1st)	9.469% (1st)
Average		5.887%	6.596%
In the table above, the blue numbers represent the lowest ratings and the red numbers represent the highest ratings.; This drama aired on a cable channel/pay TV which normally has a relatively smaller audience compared to free-to-air TV/public broadcasters (KBS, SBS, MBC, and EBS).
