= VisitKorea.or.kr =

South Korean tourism website

VisitKorea.or.kr is a South Korean tourism website by the Korea Tourism Organization (KTO). It was established in 2008 and by 2023 offered tourist information in 8 languages, with an annual average of 15 million visitors. Its languages are English, Japanese, simplified and traditional Chinese, Spanish, German, French, and Russian.

In 2023, the website was redesigned. It offered sections to create an itinerary on the website, as well as listings of various tourist destinations, restaurants, accommodations, and activities in the country. It also offered suggested featured itineraries, including Muslim-friendly travel, wellness and medical tourism, and UNESCO World Heritage Sites in the country.

== See also ==
- Korea.net – South Korean government portal
