= Kim Joo-hyuk =

South Korean actor (1972–2017)

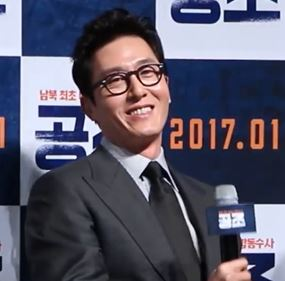
- Kim in December 2016
- Born: 3 October 1972; Gangnam District, Seoul, South Korea
- Died: 30 October 2017 (aged 45); Samseong-dong, Seoul, South Korea
- Education: Dongguk University
- Occupation: Actor
- Years active: 1998–2017
- Agent: Namoo Actors
- Father: Kim Mu-saeng

Korean name
- Hangul: 김주혁
- Hanja: 金柱赫
- RR: Gim Juhyeok
- MR: Kim Chuhyŏk

Kim Joo-hyuk (3 October 1972 – 30 October 2017) was a South Korean actor. He was known for his leading roles in the films My Wife Got Married (2008), The Servant (2010), and Yourself and Yours (2016), his supporting roles in Confidential Assignment (2017) and Believer (2018), as well as the television series Lovers in Prague (2005), God of War (2012), Hur Jun, The Original Story (2013) and Argon (2017). He was also an original regular cast member on the third season of the KBS2's reality-variety show 2 Days & 1 Night.

== Early life and education ==
In 1991, he enrolled in the Department of Theater and Film at Dongguk University. He received his bachelor's degree in 1997.

== Career ==
After graduating, Kim began acting in theater. He passed the audition for SBS 8th open talent recruitment in 1998 and subsequently landed supporting roles in SBS drama KAIST.

He made his fim debut in Say Yes (2001) with a role as a man who confronts a serial killer. It was followed by a supporting role in sport film YMCA Baseball Team (2002) as Oh Dae-hyun, an independence activist and baseball pitcher. He started getting recognition for his third film, Singles (2003).

His first leading role in film came with Hong Du-sik, of Mr. Handy, Mr. Hong (2004). Kim's portrayal of Hong Du-sik (Hong Banjang) is frequently cited as a career-defining performance and his first leading role. Though the film itself wasn't a major box-office success, Kim was widely considered perfectly cast, with critics noting his performance relied more on personal charisma and warmth. Kim Du-chan, the film producer, praised Kim, calling him "the best romantic comedy actor," dubbed him as "Korea's Hugh Grant." In a 2017 posthumous survey, Hong Banjang was voted as his most memorable role.

== Personal life ==
=== Family ===
Kim was the son of actor Kim Mu-saeng. He and his father both played real-life court physician Heo Jun.

=== Relationships ===
Kim began dating actress Kim Ji-soo in 2003; they portrayed a married couple in the 2002 TV series Like a Flowing River. Their six-year relationship ended in 2009.

Kim also dated God of War co-star Kim Gyu-ri from 2012 to 2013.

In December 2016, Kim was confirmed to be in a relationship with Yourself and Yours (2016) co-star Lee Yoo-young.

=== Death ===
On 30 October 2017, Kim was involved in a fatal car crash that occurred around 4:30 p.m. KST in Samseong-dong, Seoul. His car overturned and he was taken to Konkuk University Hospital where he was pronounced dead two hours after arrival. According to the police and Konkuk University Medical Center, "It seems the accident occurred after he showed symptoms of a myocardial infarction". However, it was later stated by the police that the autopsy showed no signs of him having a heart attack and that the cause of death was a skull fracture. Moreover, no traces of alcohol or other toxins were detected in the body and the police investigation revealed no evidence of vehicle defects that could have caused the crash.

Kim was cremated and laid to rest in his family grave at Seosan, South Chungcheong Province.

== Filmography ==
=== Film ===
Year	Title	Role	Notes	Ref.
2001	Say Yes	Jung-hyun		
2002	YMCA Baseball Team	Oh Dae-hyeon		
2003	Singles	Park Su-hyeon		
2004	Mr. Handy, Mr. Hong	Hong Du-sik		
2005	When Romance Meets Destiny	Yu Gwang-shik		
2005	Blue Swallow	Han Ji-hyeok		
2006	Love Me Not	Julian		
2008	My Wife Got Married	Noh Deok-hoon		
2010	The Servant	Bang-ja		
2011	In Love and War	Kim Jung-woong		
2011	Pitch High	Yoon Do-hoon		
2011	Couples	Yoo-seok		
2015	Intimate Enemies	Chairman	Cameo	
2015	The Beauty Inside	Woo-jin		
2016	Like for Likes	Sung-chan		
2016	The Truth Beneath	Kim Jong-chan		
2016	Yourself and Yours	Yeong-soo		
2017	Confidential Assignment	Cha Ki-seong		
2017	The Tooth and the Nail	Nam Do-jin		
2018	Heung-boo: The Revolutionist	Jo Hyuk	Posthumous release	
2018	Believer	Ha-rim	Posthumous release	

=== Television series ===
Year	Title	Role	Ref.
1998	Letters Written on a Cloudy Day		
1999	KAIST	Jung Myung-hwan	
2000	Tango in Seoul		
2000	Can Anyone Love?	Young-jae	
2002	Rival	Min Tae-hoon	
2002	Like a Flowing River	Kim Seok-joo	
2005	Lovers in Prague	Choi Sang-hyun	
2008	Terroir	Kang Tae-min	
2012	God of War	Kim Jun	
2013	Hur Jun, The Original Story	Heo Jun	
2015	Reply 1988	adult Choi Taek	
2017	Argon	Kim Baek-jin	

=== Variety shows ===
Year	Title	Notes/Ref.
2011	Saturday Night Live Korea	Host (season 1, episode 1)
2013–2015, 2017	2 Days & 1 Night - Season 3	Cast member

=== Music video appearances ===
Year	Song title	Artist
2002	"I Can't Tell"	Cha Eun-ju
2003	"Only..."	The Jun

== Discography ==
=== Soundtrack appearances ===
Year	Song title	Notes
2004	"With the mind to forget" (잊어야 한다는 마음으로)	Mr. Handy, Mr. Hong OST
2011	"Our Love Shines" (빛나라 우리 사랑아) (sung with Gong Hyung-jin, Oh Jung-se, Lee Si-young, Lee Yoon-ji)	Couples OST

== Awards and nominations ==
Award	Year	Category	Nominated work	Result
39th Baeksang Arts Awards	2003	Best New Actor (TV)	Like a Flowing River	Nominated
42nd Baeksang Arts Awards	2006	Best Actor (TV)	Lovers in Prague	Won
45th Baeksang Arts Awards	2009	Best Actor (Film)	My Wife Got Married	Nominated
55th Baeksang Arts Awards	2019	Best Supporting Actor	Believer	Won
29th Blue Dragon Film Awards	2008	Best Actor	My Wife Got Married	Nominated
29th Blue Dragon Film Awards	2008	Best Couple Award with Son Ye-jin	My Wife Got Married	Won
39th Blue Dragon Film Awards	2018	Best Supporting Actor	Believer	Won
27th Buil Film Awards	2018	Best Supporting Actor	Believer	Nominated
55th Grand Bell Awards	2018	Best Supporting Actor	Believer	Won
55th Grand Bell Awards	2018	Special Award	—N/a	Won
KBS Entertainment Awards	2014	Best Newcomer in a Variety Show	2 Days & 1 Night	Won
KBS Entertainment Awards	2015	Best Entertainer Award — Entertainment Category	2 Days & 1 Night	Won
22nd Korea Best Dresser Swan Awards	2005	Best Dressed, Film Actor category	—N/a	Won
24th Korean Popular Culture & Arts Awards	2018	Prime Minister's Commendation	—N/a	Won
MBC Drama Awards	2012	Top Excellence Award, Actor in a Serial Drama	God of War	Nominated
MBC Drama Awards	2013	Top Excellence Award, Actor in a Serial Drama	Hur Jun, the Original Story	Nominated
SBS Drama Awards	2002	Excellence Award, Actor in a Weekend/Daily Drama	Like a Flowing River	Nominated
SBS Drama Awards	2005	Top Excellence Award, Actor	Lovers in Prague	Won
SBS Drama Awards	2005	Excellence Award, Actor in a Special Planning Drama	Lovers in Prague	Nominated
SBS Drama Awards	2005	Top 10 Stars	Lovers in Prague	Won
SBS Drama Awards	2008	Excellence Award, Actor in a Special Planning Drama	Terroir	Nominated
1st The Seoul Awards	2017	Best Supporting Actor (Film)	Confidential Assignment	Won
4th Wildflower Film Awards	2017	Best Actor	Yourself and Yours	Nominated
