= Yoo Je-won =

South Korean drama director

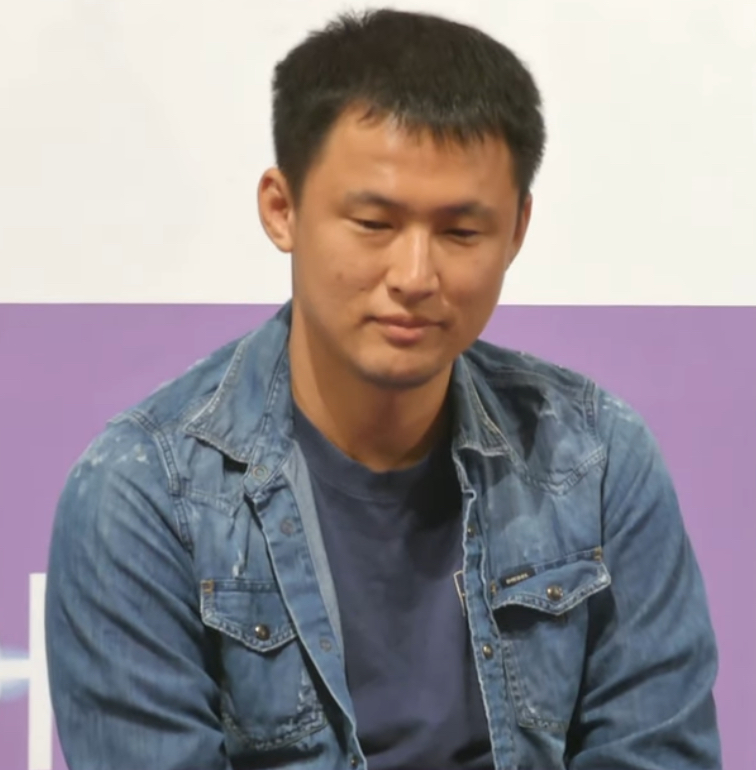
- Yoo Je-won 2019
- Born: South Korea
- Other name: Yu Je-won
- Occupation: Television director
- Years active: 2007–present
- Employers: SBS (2007–2012); Studio Dragon (2015–present))
- Notable work: Oh My Ghost; Hometown Cha-Cha-Cha; Crash Course in Romance
- Spouse: Lee Shi-ra (m. 2009)

Korean name
- Hangul: 유제원
- Hanja: 劉諸元
- RR: Yu Jewon
- MR: Yu Chewŏn

Yoo Je-won (Korean: 유제원) is a South Korean television director best known for his television dramas series, including High School King of Savvy (2014), Oh My Ghost (2015), Abyss (2019) and Hi Bye, Mama! (2020). He has also gained popularity with his most recent hit dramas, two Netflix Simulcast Original Series, Hometown Cha-Cha-Cha (2021) and Crash Course in Romance (2023).

== Career ==
=== Early careers ===
Yoo began his career in the broadcasting industry as part of the drama crew at the SBS network. In 2007, Yoo worked as assistant director for director Park Gung-ryeol on a 20-episode drama series called "Salt Doll," which was written by Park Eon-hee. Later that same year, collaborated once again with director Park Gung-ryeol and writer Park Eon-hee on the SBS drama Fly to The Sky, which aired every Friday from August 24 to October 26, 2007, and consisted of 19 episodes.

In 2008, Yoo served as assistant for director Jang Yong-woo on the weekend drama I am Happy. The drama, written by Kim Jung-soo, was aired on SBS from February 10 to August 31, 2008. In 2010, Yoo worked as assistant director for Jung Eul-young on the renowned writer Kim Soo-hyun's drama Life Is Beautiful or La Vida es Bella. This 63-episode family drama aired in SBS from March 20, 2010, to November 7, 2010, every Saturday and Sunday.

=== 2014–2020: Career as director ===
High School King of Savvy was Yoo Je-won's directorial debut. The romantic comedy, written by Yang Hee-seung, starred Seo In-guk, Lee Ha-na, Lee Soo-hyuk and Lee Yul-eum. It was broadcast on tvN from June 16 to August 11, 2014. Due to the show's popularity, the network extended the series to 17 episodes by adding an extra broadcast, followed by a special behind-the-scenes episode on August 12, 2014. It was followed by the 25-episode makjang weekend drama Tears of Heaven (2014), starring Park Ji-young, Hong Ah-reum, Seo Jun-young and Jo Yun-seo. The series aired on MBN from October 11, 2014, to January 3, 2015. At the time, the drama achieved a record-breaking viewership rating of 3.305%, which remained the highest for any MBN drama until 2019.

In 2015, Yoo and writer Yang Hee-seung collaborated once again on the fantasy romantic comedy Oh My Ghost. The series generated significant anticipation as it marked Park Bo-young's return to television after a seven-year hiatus, return to television after a seven-year hiatus, starring alongside Jo Jung-suk, Lim Ju-hwan and Kim Seul-gi. The drama follows the love story between Kang Sun-woo, an arrogant celebrity chef, and Na Bong-sun, a timid assistant chef who possesses the ability to see ghosts. Bong-sun's life changes dramatically when she is possessed by a lustful virgin spirit, completely altering her introverted personality. The 16-episode series aired on tvN from July 3 to August 22, 2015, and achieved both commercial and critical acclaim. Its peak viewership rating of 7% was among the highest for a cable television drama at the time.

After a two-year hiatus, Yoo returned with a time-travel themed fantasy drama series called Tomorrow, With You. Starring Shin Min-a and Lee Je-hoon, it was started airing on February 3, 2017, on cable channel tvN. However, this series didn't achieve the same level of success as Yoo's previous television series. Following that, Yoo worked as an assistant director under director Ahn Gil-ho on the tvN drama Stranger.

In 2018, Yoo reunited with Seo In-guk for a South Korean remake of the 2002 Japanese television series Sora Kara Furu Ichioku no Hoshi. The Korean version was titled The Smile Has Left Your Eyes. Jung So-min and Park Sung-woong also joined the project. It was first aired on tvN on October 3, 2018.

In 2019, Yoo reunited with Park Bo-young in tvN drama Abyss, with Ahn Hyo-seop and Lee Sung-jae joining as her co-stars. The drama revolves around a man and a woman who are resurrected from death with different faces through a mysterious soul-reviving bead called Abyss.

In 2020, Yoo collaborated with writer Kwon In-woo on the fantasy melodrama Hi Bye, Mama! The drama was highly anticipated as it marked Kim Tae-hee's comeback after five years, and it also starred rising stars Lee Kyu-hyung and Go Bo-gyeol. The storyline depicts the 49-day reincarnation story of a ghost mother who reappears in front of her husband and daughter, who have already started a new life after overcoming the pain of bereavement. It aired on tvN from February 22 to April 19, 2020.

=== 2021–present: Breakthrough, mainstream success ===
In April 2021, Studio Dragon announced that Yoo will be reunited with Shin Min-a, as director of Seaside Village Cha-Cha-Cha, a remake of 2004 South Korean film Mr. Handy, Mr. Hong. It was first announced on December 21, 2020, under the working title of Hong Banjang (홍반장) with Shin Min-a and Kim Seon-ho being offered the lead roles. In June, it was announced that the series English title is Hometown Cha-Cha-Cha and it will be available for streaming on Netflix. This is a healing romance drama about a realist dentist Yoon Hye-jin (Shin Min-a) and an all-rounder, Hong Banjang (Kim Seon-ho), a sea village called Gongjin. A genius variety producer Ji PD (Lee Sang-yi) then select Gongjin as setting for his new variety show. This 16 episodes drama were aired from August 28 to October 17, 2021, on tvN's Saturdays and Sundays at 21:00 (KST).

Branded as healing drama, Hometown Cha-Cha-Cha received favorable reviews from domestic and foreign viewers. It became one of the highest-rated series on cable television history. It ranked first place during its entire run for eight weeks, and the last episode achieved 12.665% nationwide rating, with over 3.2 million views. Hometown Cha-Cha-Cha also one of 2021 most-watched non-English television on Netflix. According to FlixPatrol, (Note: FlixPatrol is a portal that provides VOD charts and streaming ratings worldwide, includes the Netflix charts (Netflix TOP 10 or what is Trending on Netflix), iTunes charts, Amazon Prime charts and HBO charts. These charts are based on the official trending or the most popular movies and the most popular TV shows on VOD. TOP 10 lists are updated daily.) the series placed number 8 on Netflix global chart. Netflix's one of its longest-running hits as it spent 16 weeks in global top ten ranking in more than 20 countries. It also remained on Netflix's Top 10 Chart for television shows for more than two months from its last episode.

On December 21, 2020, the Kim Soo-hyun Drama Art Hall, operated by the Cheongju City Culture Industry Promotion Foundation, selected Hometown Cha-Cha-Cha as '2021 Good Drama of the Year'. Yoo as director, Shin Ha-eun as writer, and the lead actors were recognized in the certificate of award. It was selected by both the viewer evaluation team and the expert group and was praised as a "K-healing drama" that emerged during a period when provocative genre content was rampant, and was loved by viewers both domestically and internationally. The panel, describing it as a work that perfectly fits the criteria of a good drama pursued by the drama art hall, broadcast content that conveys warm stories about human nature and people's lives.

Yoo reunited with Yang Hee-seung for their third collaboration in the romantic-comedy drama Crash Course in Romance which premiered on tvN in January 2023. The series, starring Jeon Do-yeon and Jung Kyung-ho, revolved around a former national handball player who now runs a banchan shop, raising her high school daughter alone and celebrity math instructor at a popular private academy.

The drama Crash Course in Romance gained significant popularity during its airing. On March 5, 2023, the tvN drama concluded with an audience rating of 17%, marking a substantial increase from its initial rating of 4.0% on the first broadcast. The drama consistently climbed in ratings, eventually surpassing four times its starting rating for the final episode. This remarkable performance was not limited to viewership ratings alone; the drama also garnered high topicality throughout its entire run. It held the top spot in topicality for eight consecutive weeks in the TV drama category. The second half of the drama witnessed a notable surge in both ratings and popularity.

According to Good Data Corporation, the drama consistently ranked first in the Top 10 TV Topicality Ranking for four consecutive weeks, securing a topical share of 23.8%. The program's initial topicality score was 9,654 points during its first week, and it reached a peak of 43,030 points, more than four times the initial score. Additionally, this work has set various records, including eight consecutive weeks in first place in the topical TV drama category, six consecutive weeks in first place in the TV-OTT integrated category, and six consecutive weeks with actor Jung Kyung-ho leading the TV topical performer category. Roh Yoon-seo also achieved first place in the TV topical performer category for five weeks. Furthermore, the program topped the TV search response for six consecutive weeks, held the first position in the TV topical VON category for seven weeks, and attained first place in the TV topical news category on five occasions.

== Personal life ==
On May 17, 2008, Yoo tied the knot with Lee Shi-ra. On this special day, Lee Hoon volunteered to host the wedding ceremony. In line with their reputation for great teamwork, a large number of cast members of drama I am Happy also attended the wedding ceremony. Kim Jong-seo serenaded the couple with a congratulatory song during the wedding.

Since they met in drama Oh My Ghost, Yoo was given the nickname Yoovely by Park Bo-young, a portmanteau of his surname and the English word "lovely."

== Filmography ==
=== Television series ===
Directing credit
Year	Title		Network	Credited as		Ref.
Year	English	Korean	Network	Assistant Director	Director	Ref.
2007	Salt Doll	소금인형]	SBS	Yes	Park Gung-ryeol	
2007	Fly to The Sky	날아오르다	SBS	Yes	Park Gung-ryeol	
2008	I am Happy	행복합니다	SBS	Yes	Jang Yong-woo	
2010	Life Is Beautiful or La Vida es Bella	인생은 아름다워	SBS	Yes (Note: with Seo Young-rok)	Jung Eul-young	
2012	Rooftop Prince	옥탑방 왕세자	SBS	Yes (Note: Kim Na-young)	Shin Yoon-sub; Ahn Gil-ho	
2014	High School King of Savvy	고교처세왕	tvN	No	Yes	
2014	Tears of Heaven	천국의 눈물	tvN	No	Yes	
2015	Oh My Ghost	오 나의 귀신님	tvN	No	Yes	
2017	Tomorrow, With You	내일 그대와 숲	tvN	No	Yes	
2017	Stranger Season 1	비밀의 숲	tvN	Yes	Ahn Gil-ho	
2018	The Smile Has Left Your Eyes	하늘에서 내리는 일억개의 별	tvN	No	Yes	
2019	Abyss	어비스	tvN	No	Yes	
2020	The King: Eternal Monarch	더 킹: 영원의 군주	tvN	Yes (Note: with Jung Ji-hyun)	Baek Sang-hoon	
2020	Hi Bye, Mama!	하이바이, 마마!	tvN	No	Yes	
2021	Doom at Your Service	어느 날 우리 집 현관으로 멸망이 들어왔다	tvN; TVING	Yes	Kwon Young-il	
2021	Hometown Cha-Cha-Cha	갯마을 차차차	tvN; TVING	No	Yes	
2023	Crash Course in Romance	일타 스캔들	tvN; TVING	No	Yes	
2024	Love Next Door	엄마친구아들	tvN; TVING	No	Yes	
2025	Love, Take Two	첫, 사랑을 위하여	tvN; TVING	No	Yes	

== Casting ==
Yoo frequently re-casts actors whom he has worked with on previous dramas.

Recurring casts
Actor Work	Bae Hae-sun	In Gyo-jin	Jang Young-nam	Jo Han-chul	Jung So-min	Kang Ki-young	Kim Ji-hyun	Kim Sung-bum	Kwon So-hyun	Lee Bong-ryun	Lee Do-yeop	Lee Ho-jae (Note: Shin Hye-sun also worked with Yoo Je-won for 3rd time in Stranger Season 1)	Lee Sang-yi	Lee Yong-yi	Oh Eui-shik	Park Bo-young (Note: Park Bo-young also worked with Yoo Je-won for the 3rd time in Doom at Your Service)	Seo In-guk (Note: Seo In-guk also worked with Yoo Je-won for the 5th time in Doom at Your Service)	Shin Min-a	Shin Hye-sun (Note: Shin Hye-sun also worked with Yoo Je-won for 3rd time in Stranger Season 1)
High School King of Savvy				check		check											check		check
Tears of Heaven		check												check					
Oh My Ghost						check		check			check				check	check	check		check
Tomorrow, With You				check						check								check	
The Smile Has Left Your Eyes			check		check		check		check								check		
Abyss					check			check	check							check	check		
Hi Bye, Mama!	check											check			check				
Hometown Cha-Cha-Cha	check	check		check			check	check		check	check	check	check	check	check			check	
Crash Course in Romance	check		check							check			check		check				
Love Next Door			check	check	check														

== Awards and nominations ==
List of award(s) and nomination(s)
Award	Year	Category	Recipient	Result	Ref.
Asian Academy Creative Awards	2022	National Winner (Korea) – Best Direction (Fiction)	Yoo Je-won — Hometown Cha-Cha-Cha	Won	
Asian Academy Creative Awards	2022	Best Direction (Fiction)	Yoo Je-won — Hometown Cha-Cha-Cha	Nominated	
Kim Soo-hyun Drama Art Hall (Note: Kim Soo-hyun Drama Art Hall managed by Cheongju Cultural Industry Promotion Foundation is drama literature center, an exhibition space of drama writer Kim Soo-Hyun and her works)	2021	Serial Drama Category – Good Drama of the Year	Yoo Je-won — Hometown Cha-Cha-Cha	Won (Note: Drama's network, director, writer and main actors are recognized in the award certificates, with tvN, Shin Ha-eun, Shin Min-a, Kim Seon-ho, Lee Sang-yi, Gong Min-jeung, and Kim Young-ok)	
