= Seungmin =

South Korean singer (born 2000)

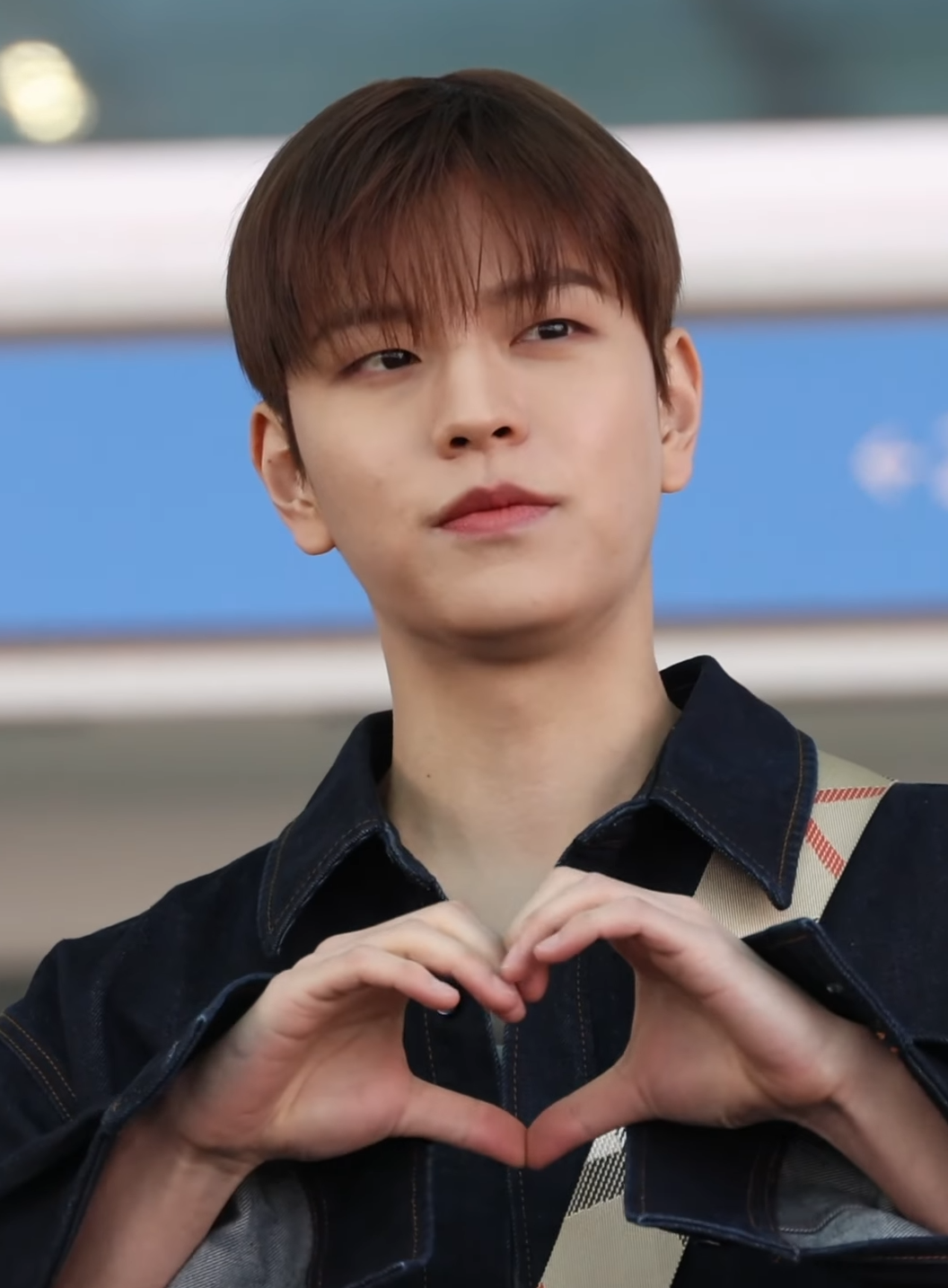
- Seungmin in February 2026
- Born: Kim Seung-min; September 22, 2000 (age 26); Seoul, South Korea
- Education: Chungdam High School
- Occupation: Singer
- Years active: 2017–present
- Musical career
- Genres: K-pop; hip hop; electronics
- Instrument: Vocals
- Label: JYP
- Member of: Stray Kids; JYP Nation

Korean name
- Hangul: 김승민
- RR: Gim Seungmin
- MR: Kim Sŭngmin

Signature
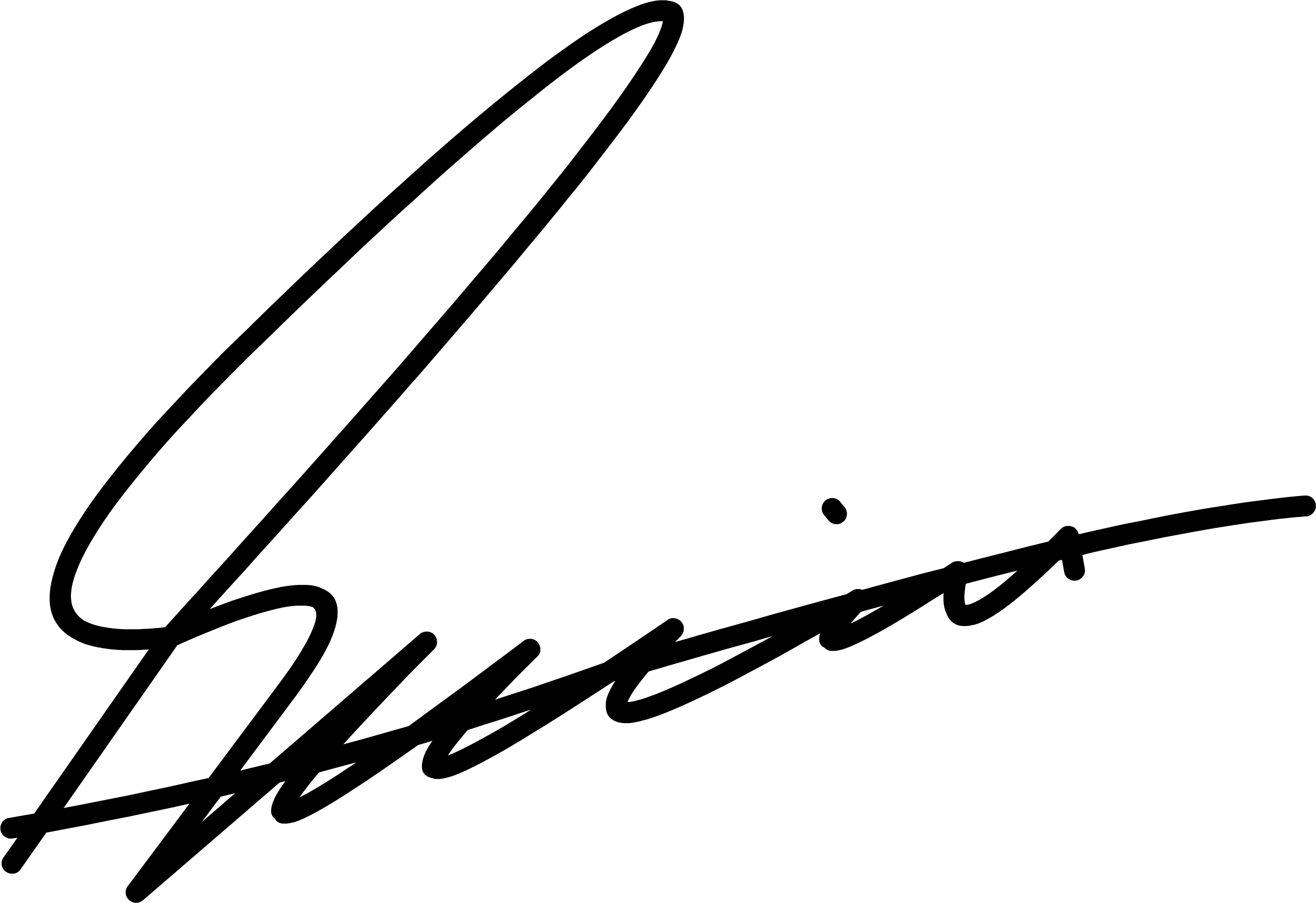

Kim Seung-min (Korean: 김승민; born September 22, 2000), known mononymously as Seungmin, is a South Korean singer. He is a member of the South Korean boy band Stray Kids, formed by JYP Entertainment in 2017.

Additionally, Seungmin has served as an MC for After School Club and We K-Pop. He has contributed to various original soundtracks for K-dramas, including Hometown Cha-Cha-Cha, Love in Contract, The Midnight Studio and the television series The Potato Lab. He also recorded an original soundtrack for the web novel and webtoon I'm the Queen in this Life.

== Early life and education ==
Kim Seung-min was born on September 22, 2000, in Seoul, South Korea. Growing up, he wanted to become a baseball player, having played baseball as a right-handed pitcher when he was young.

On February 23, 2017, Seungmin won second place in JYP Entertainment's 13th Open Audition and was accepted as a trainee under JYP Entertainment.

Seungmin graduated from Chungdam High School on February 14, 2019.

== Career ==
=== 2017–present: Debut with Stray Kids and solo endeavors ===
In 2017, Seungmin appeared in the JYP survival show Stray Kids, a show which allowed him to debut as Stray Kids member.

Kim Seungmin officially debuted with Stray Kids on March 25, 2018, through their debut showcase of the group, Stray Kids Unveil (Op. 01: I Am Not), at Jangchung Arena. On the next day, Seungmin with Stray Kids released an EP titled I Am Not and the lead single "District 9" which they showcased during the debut showcase. In this album, he also participated in the lyrics making of song "Mixtape #1". (Note: Later in 2019, "Mixtape #1" also included in the EP Clé 2: Yellow Wood.)

On July 24, 2018, Seungmin was selected as the Regular MC of After School Club with Jimin and Han Hee-jun. From July 12 to October 11, 2019, he was a MC for the variety program We K-Pop with Kim Shin-young, 2PM's Nichkhun, and SF9's Inseong.

On March 18, 2024, Seungmin was selected as the first pitch for a special game between Team Korea and the LA Dodgers as part of the MLB World Tour Seoul Series 2024 with Coupang Play.

==== Solo releases ====
After debuting, Stray Kids began a YouTube-based non-album singles project, SKZ-Record/Player. As of July 2025, Seungmin is one of the most prolific contributors to the project. This activity, coupled with Stray Kids' win on Kingdom: Legendary War and Seungmin's individual appearances on shows such as LeeMujin Service and King of Masked Singer, has continued to build Seungmin's profile as a singer.

===== SKZ-Record/Player and original songs =====
On March 25, 2021, "Piece of a Puzzle", a song co-written with Stray Kids members Bang Chan and Changbin, was released in celebration of Stray Kids' 3rd Debut Anniversary. On 18 June, 2021, Seungmin, Felix, Changbin and Bang Chan released "Up All Night", to the project with an accompanying music video. Both songs were later included on the SKZ-Replay album in December 2022.

On 27 March 2023, together with Felix and Changbin, Seungmin released the subunit track, "Snain". On August 13, 2023, Seungmin released "Hold On", a song Han wrote about the death of a pet and wanted Seungmin to sing. In June 2024, Seungmin and Han released "Respirator", a duet they had debuted three months prior in a performance on the final day of Stray Kids' fourth fan-meeting, SKZ Magic School, in March. In July 2025, Seungmin released "Goodbye", which was written by Bang Chan about his experiences moving to South Korea away from his family when young, followed by "Still Here", written by Changbin in January 2026, and "Into the Current" written by Han in May 2026, making him the only member of Stray Kids that has performed a solo song by each of the three members of 3Racha.

On December 21, 2022, Seungmin's original solo song "Stars and Raindrops" was released and included as part of the compilation album SKZ-Replay. Seungmin's original solo "As We Are", first performed in August 2024 as part of Stray Kids' DominATE tour in Seoul, was released in December 2024 as part of Stray Kids' special album, Hop, with an accompanying music video released to the band's SKZ-Record/Player YouTube project. In March 2025, as part of Stray Kids' digital single album Mixtape: Dominate, Seungmin released "Cinema", a duet with Lee Know, with an accompanying music video released on the Stray Kids YouTube channel.

In August 2026, Seungmin's previously unreleased original song, "Perfume", which was performed during Stray Kids' 5-Star Dome Tour in 2023, was released on the SKZ-REPLAY 2026 Pt.1 album, together with "Goodbye", "Still here", and "Into The Current".

===== Cover versions =====
As of July 2025, Seungmin had contributed the most cover versions to the SKZ-Record/Player project: six solo covers (covers of "You Were Beautiful" by Day6, "Start Over" by Gaho, and "Stay As You Are" by Sandeul in 2020; a cover of "Love Again" by Baekhyun in 2021; a cover of Justin Bieber's "Ghost" in 2022; and a cover of "Event Horizon" by Younha in 2023); and two duets with Han ("Congratulations" and "Zombie", both originally by Day6).

==== Song By ====
In 2024, Seungmin began his own mini-series on Stray Kids' YouTube channel, the Song By project, where he sang a variety of songs which held meaning for him. In the first episode, he covered "Love Poem" by IU, a song which he had previously covered in the team-up round of Kingdom: Legendary War with Eunkwang of BTOB and Jongho of Ateez, to some acclaim. In subsequent episodes, he covered songs by artists including 2NE1, Billie Eilish, Lauv, Radiohead, and Yoasobi. The mini-series was paused in June 2025, after Seungmin performed a cover of "Finale." by Japanese singer-songwriter eill. In August 2026, he uploaded a Song By version of "Back Then", the seventh track on Stray Kids' "This & That" Album.

==== Soundtrack appearances ====
On October 10, 2021, Seungmin released his first solo original soundtrack, "Here Always" for South Korean drama Hometown Cha-Cha-Cha. The song debuted at number 13 on Circle Download Chart issue dated October 10 to 16.

On October 19, 2022, Seungmin released his second original soundtrack "Close to You" for Love in Contract. The song debuted at number 154 on the Circle Download Chart issue dated October 16 to 22.

On March 7, 2024, Genie TV's original The Midnight Studio announced that Seungmin will participate in the drama's original soundtrack. The drama OST title "Destiny" was revealed and released later on April 9, 2024. "Destiny" was debuted at number 103 on the Circle Download Chart issue dated April 7 to 13. On March 15, 2024, Seungmin released an original soundtrack "Phobia" for Web novel and Webtoon titled I'm the Queen in This Life. The OST debuted at number 160 at the Circle Download Chart issue dated March 10 to 16.

On February 28, 2025, the production team of tvN's weekend drama The Potato Lab announced that Seungmin would feature on its original soundtrack. The song, "My Destiny", was released on March 2, 2025. The OST debuted at number 139 at the Circle Download Chart issue dated March 2 to 8. On April 8, it was reported that Seungmin, together with his bandmates Lee Know and I.N, would be part of tvN's weekend drama Resident Playbook's original soundtrack. The song, dubbed "Start!", was released on April 12, 2025. On September 30, 2025, it was announced that Seungmin would feature on the soundtrack of SBS drama, Would You Marry Me?. The original song, "It Has to Be You", was released on October 10.

== Other ventures ==
=== Fashion ===
In November 2023, Seungmin appeared on the special cover of Nylon Japan, in collaboration with Coach for their holiday campaign in Japan.

On March 1, 2024, Seungmin made his fashion week debut attending the Loewe Fall Winter 2024 Women's Show held in Paris. British Vogue featured him in their article on best front-row styles of PFW. In May 2024, he made his Met Gala debut with Stray Kids as the guest of Tommy Hilfiger.

In March 2025 Seungmin attended a party in Paris organized by the LVMH owned jewelry brand Chaumet. While in Paris, he shot the W Korea May 2025 cover feature for the brand.

On June 5, 2025, Seungmin was revealed as one of the faces of the Burberry Festival campaign, which marked his second collaboration with the brand, after the Harper's Bazaar Korea June 2025 cover feature. Later that month, the brand appointed him to be an ambassador.

=== Philanthropy ===
Seungmin donated ₩100 million (equivalent to ₩104.49 million or US$77,964.64 in 2025) to child welfare organization Green Umbrella on his birthday in 2024 and 2025.

== Personal life ==
In September 2023, Seungmin, along with fellow Stray Kids members Lee Know and Hyunjin, was involved in a car accident that led to their absence from the Global Citizen Festival performance. None of the members sustained serious injuries.

In March 2026, JYP released a statement announcing that Seungmin had experienced a stress fracture in his left ankle.

== Discography ==
=== Songs ===
List of songs, with selected chart positions, showing year released and album name
Title	Year	Peak chart positions					Album
Title	Year	KOR DL	JPN DL	NZ Hot	UK Sales	US World	Album
"My Universe" (with I.N featuring Changbin)	2020	—	—	—	—	21	In Life
"Piece of a Puzzle" (조각) (with Changbin)	2021	—	—	—	—	—	SKZ-Replay
"Up All Night" (오늘 밤 나는 불을 켜) (with Bang Chan, Changbin, and Felix)	2021	—	—	—	—	—	SKZ-Replay
"Gone Away" (with Han and I.N)	2021	25	—	—	—	—	Noeasy
"Waiting for Us" (with Bang Chan, Lee Know, and I.N)	2022	25	—	—	—	—	Oddinary
"Can't Stop" (나 너 좋아하나봐) (with I.N)	2022	31	—	—	—	—	Maxident
"Stars and Raindrops" (내려요) (Note: credited to Stray Kids, but the track is a solo by Seungmin)	2022	195	—	—	—	—	SKZ-Replay
"Snain" (비바람) (Note: "Snain" released only on YouTube and YouTube Music as part of SKZ-Record project.) (with Changbin and Felix)	2023	—	—	—	—	—	Non-album songs
"Hold On" (Note: "Hold On" released only on YouTube and YouTube Music as part of SKZ-Record project.)	2023	—	—	—	—	—	Non-album songs
"Perfume"	2023	—	—	—	—	—	SKZ-Replay 2026 Pt.1
"Respirator" (산소호흡기) (Note: "Respirator" released only on YouTube and YouTube Music as part of SKZ-Record project.) (with Han)	2024	—	—	—	—	—	Non-album song
"As We Are" (그렇게, 천천히, 우리)	2024	29	—	—	—	—	Hop
"Cinema" (with Lee Know)	2025	141	52	31	47	2	Mixtape: Dominate
"Goodbye"	2025	—	—	—	—	—	SKZ-Replay 2026 Pt.1
"Still Here" (제자리걸음)	2026	—	—	—	—	—	SKZ-Replay 2026 Pt.1
"Into the Current" (급류)	2026	—	—	—	—	—	SKZ-Replay 2026 Pt.1
"—" denotes a recording that did not chart or was not released in that region.

=== Soundtrack appearances ===
List of soundtrack appearances, with selected chart positions, showing year released and album name
Title	Year	Peak chart positions			Album
Title	Year	KOR	HUN	US World	Album
"Here Always"	2021	125	8	8	Hometown Cha-Cha-Cha OST Part.7
"Close to You"	2022	— (Note: "Close to You" did not chart on the Circle Digital Chart, but peaked at number 154 on the component Download Chart.)	—	—	Love in Contract OST Part.3
"Phobia"	2024	— (Note: "Phobia" did not chart on the Circle Digital Chart, but peaked at number 160 on the component Download Chart.)	—	—	I'm the Queen in This Life OST Part.2
"Destiny" (우리 만남은 우연이었을까요)	2024	— (Note: "Destiny" did not chart on the Circle Digital Chart, but peaked at number 103 on the component Download Chart, and number 6 on the component BGM Chart.)	—	—	The Midnight Studio OST Part.5
"My Destiny"	2025	— (Note: "My Destiny" did not chart on the Circle Digital Chart but peaked at number 139 on the component Download Chart, and number 36 on the component BGM Chart.)	—	—	The Potato Lab OST Part.1
"Start!" (with Lee Know and I.N)	2025	— (Note: "Start!" did not chart on the Circle Digital Chart but peaked at number 58 on the component Download Chart, and number 87 on the component BGM Chart.)	—	—	Resident Playbook OST Part.1
"It Has to Be You" (너여야만)	2025	— (Note: "It Has to Be You" did not enter the Circle Digital Chart, but peaked at number 150 on the component Download Chart, and number 48 on the component BGM Chart.)	—	—	Would You Marry Me? OST Part.1
"—" denotes a recording that did not chart or was not released in that region.

=== Songwriting credits ===
All song credits are adapted from the Korea Music Copyright Association's (KOMCA) database unless noted otherwise.

Year	Song	Album	Artist(s)	Lyrics		Music	
Year	Song	Album	Artist(s)	Credit	With	Credit	With
2017	"4419"	Mixtape	Stray Kids	Yes	Bang Chan, Changbin, Han, Hyunjin	No	
2018	"Mixtape #1"	I Am Not	Stray Kids	Yes	Bang Chan, Changbin, Han, Hyunjin, Lee Know, Woojin, I.N, Felix	No	
2018	"Mixtape #2"	I Am Who	Stray Kids	Yes	Bang Chan, Changbin, Han, Hyunjin, Lee Know, Woojin, I.N, Felix	Yes	Bang Chan, Changbin, Han, Hyunjin, Lee Know, Woojin, I.N, Felix
2018	"Mixtape #3"	I Am You	Stray Kids	Yes	Bang Chan, Changbin, Han, Hyunjin, Lee Know, Woojin, I.N, Felix	Yes	Bang Chan, Changbin, Han, Hyunjin, Lee Know, Woojin, I.N, Felix
2019	"Mixtape #4"	Clé 1: Miroh	Stray Kids	Yes	Bang Chan, Changbin, Han, Hyunjin, Lee Know, Woojin, I.N, Felix	Yes	Bang Chan, Changbin, Han, Hyunjin, Lee Know, Woojin, I.N, Felix
2019	"My Universe"	In Life	Seungmin, I.N (feat. Changbin)	Yes	Changbin, I.N, Ung Kim, Iggy	No	
2019	"Mixtape #5"	Clé: Levanter	Stray Kids	Yes	Bang Chan, Changbin, Han, Hyunjin, Lee Know, I.N, Felix	Yes	Bang Chan, Changbin, Han, Hyunjin, Lee Know, I.N, Felix
2021	"Piece of a Puzzle" (조각)	SKZ-Replay	Changbin, Seungmin	Yes	Changbin	Yes	Bang Chan, Changbin
2021	"Gone Away"	Noeasy	Han, Seungmin, I.N	Yes	Han, I.N	Yes	Armadillo, Han, I.N, Gump
2021	"Placebo" (Note: alt title of "Mixtape #1" after revision)	SKZ2021	Stray Kids	Yes	Bang Chan, Changbin, Han, Hyunjin, Lee Know, I.N, Felix	No	
2021	"Behind the Light" (그림자도 빛이 있어야 존재) (Note: alt title of "Mixtape #2" after revision)	SKZ2021	Stray Kids	Yes	Bang Chan, Changbin, Han, Hyunjin, Lee Know, I.N, Felix	Yes	Bang Chan, Lee Know, Changbin, Hyunjin, Han, Felix, I.N
2021	"For You" (Note: Alternative title of "Mixtape #3" after revision)	SKZ2021	Stray Kids	Yes	Bang Chan, Changbin, Han, Hyunjin, Lee Know, I.N, Felix	Yes	Bang Chan, Lee Know, Changbin, Hyunjin, Han, Felix, I.N
2021	"Broken Compass" (Note: Alternative title of "Mixtape #4" after revision)	SKZ2021	Stray Kids	Yes	Bang Chan, Changbin, Han, Hyunjin, Lee Know, I.N, Felix	Yes	Bang Chan, Lee Know, Changbin, Hyunjin, Han, Felix, I.N
2021	"Hoodie Season" (Note: Alternative title of "Mixtape #5" after revision)	SKZ2021	Stray Kids	Yes	Bang Chan, Changbin, Han, Hyunjin, Lee Know, I.N, Felix	Yes	Bang Chan, Lee Know, Changbin, Hyunjin, Han, Felix, I.N
2022	"Waiting For Us" (피어난다)	Oddinary	Bang Chan, Lee Know, Seungmin, I.N	Yes	Bang Chan, Lee Know, I.N	Yes	Bang Chan, Lee Know, I.N, Nickko Young
2022	"Can't Stop" (나 너 좋아하나봐)	Maxident	Seungmin, I.N	Yes	I.N, Hong Jisang	Yes	I.N, Hong Jisang
2022	"Stars and Raindrops" (내려요)	SKZ-Replay	Seungmin	Yes	Hong Jisang	Yes	Hong Jisang
2023	"Novel	The Sound	Stray Kids	Yes	KM-Markit	Yes	Bang Chan, Nickko Young
2023	"Party's Not Over"	Non-album singles	Stray Kids	Yes	Changbin, Restart	No	
2023	"Perfume"	Non-album singles	Seungmin	Yes	Restart	Yes	Restart, Chae Gang-hae
2024	"Respirator" (산소호흡기)	Non-album singles	Han, Seungmin	Yes	Han	Yes	Han, Kim Sungtae, Kang Yonnu, High Brew
2024	"As We Are" (그렇게천천히우리)	Hop	Seungmin	Yes	Hong Jisang	Yes	Hong Jisang
2025	"Cinema"	Mixtape: Dominate	Lee Know, Seungmin	Yes	Lee Know	Yes	Lee Kihwan, Cona

== Videography ==
=== Music videos ===
List of music videos, showing year released, artist and name of the album
Title	Year	Artist(s)	Album	Ref.
"그렇게, 천천히, 우리(As we are)"	2024	Seungmin	Hop	
"My Destiny"	2025	Seungmin	The Potato Lab OST Part.1	
"Start!"	2025	Lee Know, Seungmin, I.N	Resident Playbook OST Part.1	

== Filmography ==
=== Television shows ===
Year	Title	Role	Notes	Ref.
2017	Stray Kids	Contestant	Debuted with Stray Kids	
2023	King of Masked Singer	Contestant	as Ink (잉크); Episode 408-409	

=== Hosting ===
Year	Title	Role	Notes	Ref.
2018	After School Club	Co-host	July 24 – December 25, 2018 (Episode 326–348)	
2019	We K-Pop	Co-host	July 12 – October 11, 2019 (Episode 1–14)	

=== Radio shows ===
Year	Title	Role	Notes	Ref.
2021	Day6 Kiss the Radio	Special DJ	October 11–15, 2021	

== Awards and nominations ==
Name of the award ceremony, year presented, award category, nominee(s) of the award, and the result of the nomination
Award ceremony	Year	Category	Nominee(s)/work(s)	Result	Ref.
K-World Dream Awards	2026	Male Solo Popularity Award	Himself	Pending	
Korean Wave Entertainment Awards	2026	Best OST Award	"It Has to Be You"	Nominated	
