= We K-Pop =

Korean television program

- Promotional poster
- Genre: Variety show
- Written by: Park So-hyung; Park Yeon-sun; Kim Na-yun; Kim Eun-sol
- Directed by: Yoon Koun
- Starring: Kim Shin-young; Nichkhun; Inseong; Seungmin
- Country of origin: South Korea
- Original language: Korean

Production
- Executive producers: Park, Cheon-gi
- Producer: Geum Dong-seol
- Running time: 60 minutes

Original release
- Network: KBS World
- Release: July 12, 2019

Related
- We K-Pop Friends

We K-Pop is a South Korean variety program on KBS World which first aired on July 12, 2019. The show's four hosts, Kim Shin-young, 2PM's Nichkhun, SF9's Inseong and Stray Kids' Seungmin introduce K-pop artists each week, who perform and greet their global fans. The hosts are joined by Billboard K-Town's Jeff Benjamin for music talks. The show can be viewed on the TV station and on the KBS website.

== Background ==
Music show host Kim Shin-young is joined by three active Korean idols who introduce two of their own groups in the first two episodes, Stray Kids and SF9. The show also includes English language talks with Billboard columnist Jeff Benjamin, known for his "deep affection" for K-pop, and whose articles have included BTS and their contributions to the North American and international music markets.

The show's format includes online fan participation and has a viewership of approximately 100 million global fans and household viewers from about 120 countries. Director Yoon Koun said the show's global fan meeting concept,"focuses on communication with fans and artists, unlike most other music programs." Fan responses and requests help decide which artists appear on the show, such as X1's selection. The show's Twitter account solicits fan questions for the guests, which are used in the show's production. The show hosts on-site events for its recordings with a studio audience of about 150 fans, and for example, on September 6, 2019, a few fans were selected to chat with X1 members on KakaoTalk, and included communication with fans through SNS. Along with fan interest for X1, Benjamin recommended the new group and participated in promoting them on his SNS, a part of his stated goal of helping spread K-pop internationally.

== 2019 episode guest list (1–present) ==
Ep.#	Date	Guest(s)	Ref.
1	July 12	Stray Kids	
2	July 19	SF9	
3	July 26	GFriend	
4	August 2	GFriend	
5	August 9	NCT Dream	
6	August 16	NCT Dream	
7	August 23	Day6	
8	August 30	Day6	
9	September 6	Kim Kook-heon, Song Yuvin	
10	September 13	Celeb Five, Weki Meki	
11	September 20	X1, Rocket Punch	
12	September 27	X1, Rocket Punch	
13	October 4	X1	
14	October 11	Momoland	
15	October 18	Ateez	
16	October 25	Jeong Se-woon, The Boyz' Young-hoon, Kang Chan-hee, CIX's Hyun-suk	
17	November 1	TXT	
18	November 8	TXT	
19	November 15	N.Flying	
20	November 22	CIX	
21	November 29	Winner, Lee Jin-hyuk	
22	December 6	Winner, Lee Jin-hyuk	
23	December 13	"We K-pick" global fan vote event special	
