= Choi Yu-ree =

South Korean singer-songwriter (born 1998)

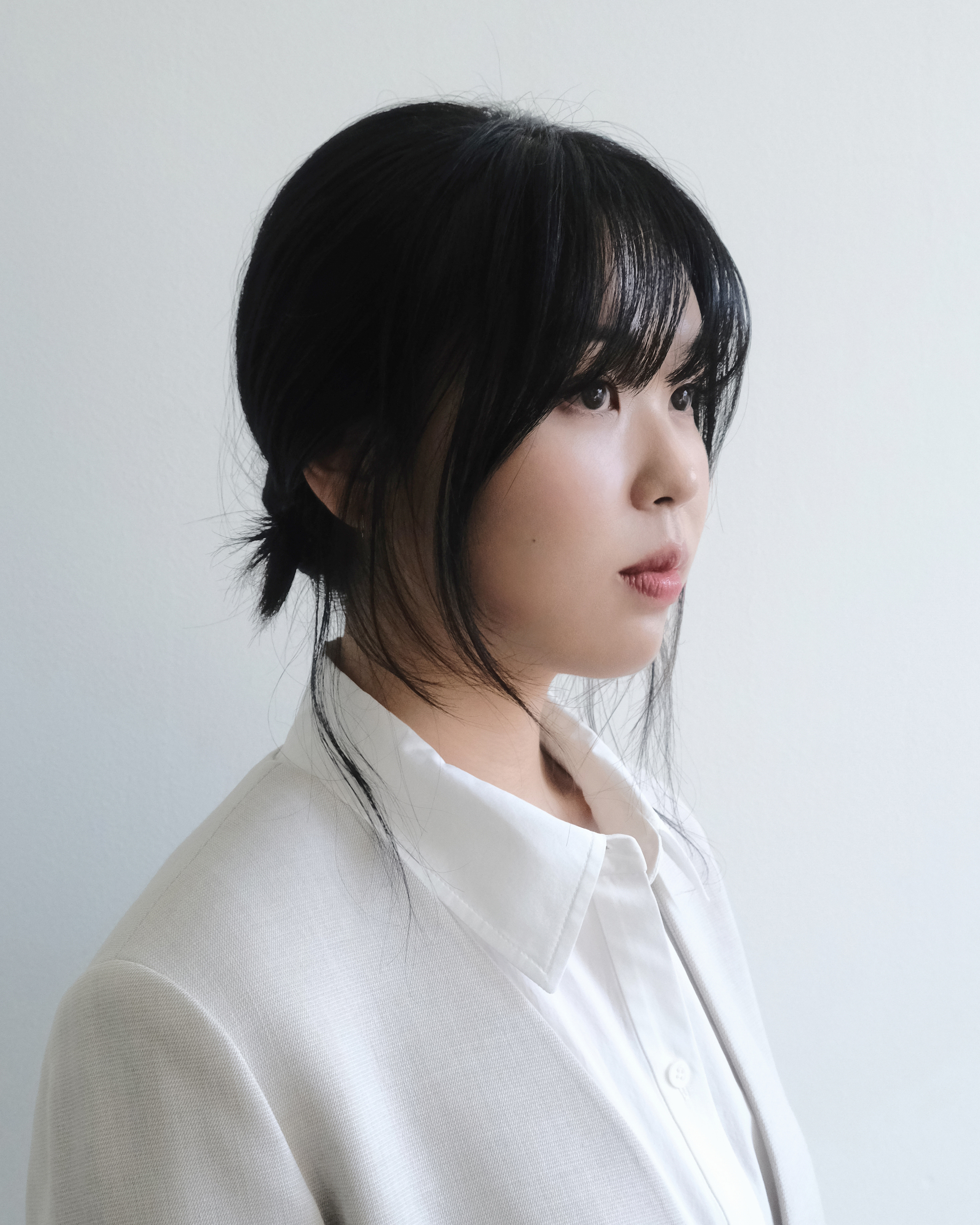
- Choi in 2021
- Born: November 24, 1998 (age 27); Pyeongchang County, Gangwon Province, South Korea
- Education: Dong-ah Institute of Media and Arts (Department of Applied Music, Composition Major/Bachelor)
- Occupation: Singer-songwriter
- Years active: 2017–present
- Musical career
- Genre: K-pop
- Instruments: Vocal; guitar; piano
- Label: Nave
- Website: navywave.kr

Korean name
- Hangul: 최유리
- RR: Choe Yuri
- MR: Ch'oe Yuri

Choi Yu-ree (Korean: 최유리; born November 24, 1998) is a South Korean singer-songwriter. Choi is known as the winner of the 29th Yoo Jae-ha Music Contest in 2018 and as one of the 23rd CJ Azit TuneUp Musicians. Her most famous single is Wish, original soundtrack of Netflix original series Hometown Cha-Cha-Cha (2021).

== Early life and education ==
Choi was born on November 24, 1998, in Pyeongchang, Gangwon Province, South Korea, and raised there.

Choi attended a piano academy from a young age and naturally began singing while playing the piano. When she was in her third year at Pyeongchang High School, her mother suggested that she go to a music university. Choi entered an entrance exam hagwon and learned jazz piano and music theory.

Choi moved to Seoul when she was accepted to the Department of Applied Music at Dong-ah Institute of Media and Arts. She graduated with a Bachelor in Composition.

== Career ==
=== 2017–2020: Career beginnings ===
In 2018, Choi competed in the 29th Yoo Jae-ha Music Contest. This competition is nicknamed the 'star making' contest due to its success in launching the careers of many accomplished musicians, such as Bang Si-hyuk, Yoo Hee-Yeol, Kim Yeon-woo, Jo Kyu-chan and Sweet Sorrow. Winning the grand prize (대상) with her self-written piece "Complaint" (푸념), Choi jump-started her career as a singer-songwriter.

"Actually, I participated in the Yoo Jae-ha Music Contest in 2017. At that time, I thought I would gain experience. But once I experienced it, I strongly felt that I wanted to try again while preparing to promote and release an album. So in 2018, I prepared thoroughly and made music with my own color, and eventually won the grand prize with the song 'Complaint'. I received the grand prize, after I decided to do official activities (as singer), so I was calm and thought that the first start was so good."

— Choi on Winning Yoo Jae-ha Music Contest (2020)

On June 1, 2019, "Complaint" (푸념) was released as the main song in the 29th Yoo Jae-ha Music Contest Album. Choi was only 22 years old at the time, so she became seen as one of the best prospects in the pop and indie music market at that time.

In the same year, Choi signed with Shofar Music as a solo artist. Choi chose this label because she used to perform regularly at 'Café Shofar', ever since her first year of college. Every Friday evening, acoustic performances by musicians have been held at Café Shofar, run by artist-type label Shofar Music. More than 100 teams of musicians have participated in this event. On October 24, 2019, her song "Regret" (후회) was released as the title track of the compilation album 'In Bloom' Cafe Chopard Compilation Vol.1. In the album, Choi became one of the representative 'Café Shofar' musicians, along with three bands, Electric Mattress, Yirang and Dali. In 2019, Choi featured on fellow indie singer-songwriter Seong In-chang's song "Letter" (편지).

At the beginning of 2020, Choi took part in the Shofar musicians' collaboration single "Awkward" (어색한 사이). It was released on January 9, 2020, as the title track of the album Shofar Music Compilation Vol.3, Awkward relationship (쇼파르뮤직 컴필레이션 Vol.3 '어색한 사이).

=== 2020: Official debut ===
On February 24, 2020, Choi made her official debut with the release of her first extended play (EP) 동그라미 Shape. Composed of a total of six songs, Shape is a work that spans various genres with the theme of Choi's daily thoughts and actions. The title track Shape is a ballad that mixes popular melodies with traditional indie music style. Two other songs, "Warm-hearted" and "Stay" are harmonizations of folk and pop music, and 'Asking everyday' is a pop song with jazzy sensibility. Her song from the previously released omnibus album "Regret" and acoustic song "Complaint" (푸념) were also included.

The title song 'Shape' was originally released by Choi through SoundCloud. Following an enthusiastic response and repeated requests from music fans for an official streaming release, it was later distributed across standard music platforms. After the release of this album, Choi said that her fans responded enthusiastically. She said with a smile, "I wondered whether my fans had waited this long."

On the November 9, 2021, IU recommended two songs from Shape via her official Instagram Story. IU posted a warm message saying, "Please warm up your heart and go" alongside a screenshot of tracks, "Warm-hearted" and "Stay" This sparked curiosity from many IU' fans, which led them to stream both songs, and they became viral on SoundCloud. Choi uploaded a screenshot to her Instagram story along with the message, "Love to all of you who like it," and thanked the fans and IU.

On June 4, 2020, Choi released her first digital single "Home" (동네), an indie/folk genre song that expresses the warmth of memories of her neighborhood. A few months later, on September 20, 2020, her second digital single "Reply" (답장) was released.

Choi released her second extended play (EP), "Only Us" (우리만은') on December 15, 2021. The album contains a total of six songs, including the title track of the same name as her album. On the EP, "Only Us" is a song that expresses the wish that no matter what wounds or painful things happen, we would like to stay here as free as we are. She added that the song reflects the theme of the album. In addition, the album contains four new songs including 'Pond', 'Old Rain', and 'Talk to Myself'. "Home" (동네) and "Reply" (답장) were released as singles in June and September respectively.

=== 2021–present: Muse On, first solo concert, CJ Azit TuneUp and soundtrack songs ===
On April 13, 2021, Choi released her third extended play (EP), "Two" (둘이). The album contains a total of five songs, including the title track "Two" (둘이). The other four songs are "Still", "Catch the Tag", "Fly" and "Love".

Choi Yu-ree's first solo concert Prologue was held at Sangsang Madang Live Hall in Hongdae, Seoul on May 15 and 16, 2021. All tickets were sold out at the same time as ticketing opened at 6 pm KST on April 19, 2021.

In July 2021, Choi was selected as one of 15 Musicians of the Year of 'Muse On 2021' (뮤즈온 2021), a project well known for cultivating domestic musicians. 'Muse On' (뮤즈온) is The Ministry of Culture, Sports and Tourism and Korea Creative Content Agency's musician development project that discovers promising musicians in Korea and helps them grow through various online and offline support programs. A total of 418 teams applied in 2021. As part of this project, Choi's third digital single "Let's Stay Well" (잘 지내자, 우리) was released on July 14, 2021. It is also Choi's first remake album, where she rearranged the original song of singer Dark and lyricist Sung Yong-wook, which was composed by Jo Eun-young and Sung Yong-work.

The online performance 'MUSE ON Day' featured three teams of selected new musicians and four teams of guest musicians, and was held five times from July until November. Choi performed in MUSE ON Day No. 2 with Yunsae and Wi Ah-young on August 21, 2021.

In the second half of 2021, Choi finally had an opportunity to do her first television soundtrack. Her song Wish was played as background music in the epilogue of episodes 5 and 6 of the highly successful drama series Hometown Cha-Cha-Cha. The song was praised as perfectly matching the mood of the scenes, with a great success in maximizing viewers' immersion. Choi, who sung, wrote and composed the song herself, explained that Wish was "a song that contains the heart of wanting to love and be loved in poverty, taking lightly the feelings that become heavy because of love." Stone Music Entertainment released Wish as single and instrumental track on the Hometown Cha-Cha-Cha OST Part 4, album on September 25, 2021. With the song, Choi was nominated in Best OST at the 2021 Mnet Asian Music Awards.

On October 5, 2021, Choi released her fourth extended play (EP), "Journey" (여정) with double title track songs, "Live goes on" (살아간다) and "Took" (툭). The other three songs are, "The End" (끝), "Who are you?" (당신은 누구시길래) and "Dejavu" (데자뷰). Just few months later, Choi made a surprise new digital single album "Journey Epilogue" (여정 에필로그) on December 16, 2021. The concept was taken from the conclusion of the previous EP "Journey" (여정) and includes a new song, "Enable" (여정).

In 2022, Choi Yu-ree was selected as one of six final winner of the 23rd Tune-Up Musicians by CJ Azit with fellow musicians Kwak Tae-pung, Kim Jae-hyung, Yoon Ji-young, ID:Earth and Off the Menu. From 727 musicians teams applied, 73 teams were selected in the first screening.

In March 2022, Choi contributed to the soundtrack for the JTBC television series Thirty-Nine with the song "That's All" (이것밖에). The OST captures the heartbreaking feeling of Jung Chan-young (Jeon Mi-do), who's terminally ill and slowly preparing for a farewell with the people she loves. It makes people realize the importance of the present together with family and friends. Choi commented, "I can only do this all the time, but in fact, that's all I am, so it's no different from giving my all."

On May 26, 2022, Choi released her fifth mini-album, "To the Other Side of Greed". Five songs were recorded that contain Choi Yuri's warm story of her past regrets and her efforts to escape from her greed.

Choi contributed to the soundtrack for the television series drama Shooting Stars with the single "Won't give up". Shooting Stars OST Part 5 was released on June in various online music sites. On top of the emotional acoustic sound, the lyrics warmly soothe the tired heart of life and give listeners comfort.

In September 2021, Choi participated in the soundtrack for the television series drama If You Wish Upon Me with the single "I'll Hide You in My Arms". The OST is a pop ballad song that begins with a gentle piano performance and continues with a heart-touching guitar performance. It contains a message of consolation that embraces the pain in the heart, telling all those who are going through hard days every day that they are never alone, and saying, 'It's okay if you don't do well, everything will pass'.

== Discography ==
=== Studio albums ===
Title	Album details	Peak chart positions	Sales
Title	Album details	KOR	Sales
746	Released: October 28, 2024; Label: Nave; Formats: CD, LP, digital download, streaming	19	KOR: 5,724

=== Extended plays ===
Title	Album details	Peak chart positions	Sales
Title	Album details	KOR	Sales
Shape (동그라미)	Released: February 24, 2020; Label: Shofar; Formats: CD, digital download, streaming; Track listing: 1. "Stay" (굳은살); 2. "Shape" (동그라미); 3. "Warmhearted" (모닥불); 4. "Reason" (매일을 물어요); 5. "Send My Mind" (푸념); 6. "Regret" (후회)	—	
At Least Only We (우리만은)	Released: December 15, 2020; Label: Shofar; Formats: CD, Digital download, streaming; Track listing: 1. "Pond" (연못); 2. "Mom" (옛날비); 3. "At Least Only We" (우리만은); 4. "Monologue" (혼잣말); 5. "Reply" (답장); 6. "Home" (동네)	—	
Us (둘이)	Released: April 13, 2021; Label: Shofar; Formats: CD, digital download, streaming; Track listing: 1. "Still" (그래도); 2. "Hide and Seek" (술래잡기); 3. "Us" (둘이); 4. "Be My Day" (날아); 5. "Love" (사랑)	—	
Journey (여정)	Released: October 5, 2021; Label: Shofar; Formats: CD, digital download, streaming; Track listing: 1. "And" (끝); 2. "Life Goes On" (살아간다); 3. "Soothing" (툭); 4. "I Owe You" (당신은 누구시길래); 5. "Dejavu" (데자뷰)	—	
To the Other Side of Greed (욕심의 반대편으로)	Released: May 26, 2022; Label: Shofar; Formats: CD, digital download, streaming; Track listing: 1. "Lost" (미아); 2. "To the Other Side of Greed" (욕심의 반대편으로); 3. "Do My Best" (노력); 4. "It's Me" (나야); 5. "Friend" (단짝)	—	
Stay: One (머무름, 하나)	Released: October 23, 2025; Label: Nave; Formats: CD, digital download, streaming; Track listing: 1. "Beyond the Hill" (언덕너머); 2. "Love Road" (사랑길); 3. "Falling" (단풍); 4. "Between Earth and Sky" (땅과 하늘 사이); 5. "Journey to the Sun" (태양여행)	59	KOR: 1,150

=== Single albums ===
Title	Details	Peak chart positions	Sales
Title	Details	KOR	Sales
Song For You	Released: June 10, 2025; Label: Nave; Formats: CD, Digital download, streaming; Track listing: 1. "Dive"; 2. "Dear World, Like a Fairy Tale"	79	KOR: 1,042

=== Singles ===
Title	Year	Peak chart positions	Album
Title	Year	KOR	Album
As lead artist
"Complaint" (푸념)	2019	—	The 29th Yoo Jae-ha Music Contest (제29회 유재하 음악경연대회)
"Regret" (후회)	2019	—	In Bloom Cafe Chopard Compilation Vol.1 (In Bloom 카페쇼파르 컴필레이션 Vol.1)
"Stay" (굳은살)	2020	—	Shape (동그라미)
"Shape" (동그라미)	2020	—	Shape (동그라미)
"Reason" (매일을 물어요)	2020	—	Shape (동그라미)
"Warmhearted" (모닥불)	2020	—	Shape (동그라미)
"Home" (동네)	2020	—	Home (동네)
"Reply" (답장)	2020	—	Reply (답장)
"Pond" (연못)	2020	—	At Least Only We (우리만은)
"Mom" (옛날비)	2020	—	At Least Only We (우리만은)
"At Least Only We" (우리만은)	2020	—	At Least Only We (우리만은)
"Monologue" (혼잣말)	2020	—	At Least Only We (우리만은)
"Still" (그래도)	2021	—	Us (둘이)
"Hide and Seek" (술래잡기)	2021	—	Us (둘이)
"Us" (둘이)	2021	—	Us (둘이)
"Be My Day" (날아)	2021	—	Us (둘이)
"Love" (사랑)	2021	—	Us (둘이)
"Let's Stay Well" (잘 지내자, 우리)	2021	151	Let's Stay Well (잘 지내자, 우리)
"And" (끝)	2021	—	Journey (여정)
"Life Goes On" (살아간다)	2021	—	Journey (여정)
"I Owe You" (당신은 누구시길래)	2021	—	Journey (여정)
"Dejavu" (데자뷰)	2021	—	Journey (여정)
"Soothing" (툭)	2021	—	Muse On 2021 Compilation
"Try" (감당)	2021	—	Journey Epilogue (여정 에필로그)
"Sleepless Nights" (답답한 새벽)	2022	—	My Swedish Laundry (나의 스웨덴세탁소)
"Lost" (미아)	2022	—	To the Other Side of Greed (욕심의 반대편으로)
"To the Other Side of Greed" (욕심의 반대편으로)	2022	—	To the Other Side of Greed (욕심의 반대편으로)
"Do My Best" (노력)	2022	—	To the Other Side of Greed (욕심의 반대편으로)
"It's Me" (나야)	2022	—	To the Other Side of Greed (욕심의 반대편으로)
"Friend" (단짝)	2022	—	To the Other Side of Greed (욕심의 반대편으로)
"Forest" (숲)	2022	58	Stroll (유영)
"Ocean" (바다)	2022	—	Stroll (유영)
"You May Live in Happiness" (그댄 행복에 살텐데)	2022	20	Non-album single
"When I Stop Thinking" (생각을 멈추다 보면)	2023	10	When I Stop Thinking
"To a Lady" (숙녀에게)	2025	189	'80s MBC Seoul Music Festival Preliminary Round
"내게 남은 사랑을 드릴께요" ("I Will Give You the Love That Is Left to Me")	2025	120	'80s MBC Seoul Gayoje Final Round Side B
Collaborations
"Letter" (편지) with Seong In-chang	2019	—	Non-album single
"Awkward" (어색한 사이) (with BOL4, Vanilla Acoustic, Sweden Laundry, 20 Years of Age, Letter Flow, Kim Ji-soo, WH3N, Boramiyu, Yuri)	2020	116	Shofar Music Compilation Vol.3, Awkward relationship (쇼파르뮤직 컴필레이션 Vol.3 '어색한 사이)
"Stay with Me" (스웨덴세탁소)(featured by Sweden Laundry)	2020	—	Non-album single
"Love Flows" (지나가요) (duet with 20 Years of Age)	2021	—	Come with Me
"Tonight" (연락하고 싶은 이 밤) with Lee Min-hyuk	2022	—	Tipping Point Part One
"—" denotes releases that did not chart.

=== Soundtrack appearances ===
Title	Year	Peak chart positions	Album
Title	Year	KOR	Album
"Wish" (바람)	2021	97	Hometown Cha-Cha-Cha OST Part 4
"That's All" (이것밖에)	2022	—	Thirty-Nine OST Part 3
"No More Encore" (앵콜요청금지)	2022	—	O'PENing Shared Office Hookup OST
"Won't Give Up"	2022	—	Shooting Stars OST Part 5
"I'll Protect You" (나의 품에 숨겨줄게)	2022	—	If You Wish Upon Me OST Part 6
"Night Sea" (밤, 바다)	2023	58	Trip: Playlist OST Part 2
"Last Minute"	2024	—	Exchange 3 OST Part 5
"Promise"	2024	115	Queen of Tears OST Part 9
"—" denotes releases that did not chart.

=== Composing and songwriting ===
Choi is registered as a songwriter with the Korea Music Copyright Association (KOMCA), with the registration number 10023084 and registration name 최유리 (Choi Yu-ree).

Publishing date	Song title	Album title	Performer	Lyrics	Composing	Arrangement
June 1, 2019	"Complaint" (푸념)	The 29th Yoo Jae-ha Music Contest (제29회 유재하 음악경연대회)	Choi Yu-ree	Yes	Yes	Yes
October 24, 2019	"Regret" (후회)	In Bloom Cafe Chopard Compilation Vol.1 (In Bloom 카페쇼파르 컴필레이션 Vol.1)	Choi Yu-ree	Yes	Yes	Yes
February 24, 2020	"Stay" (굳은살)	Circle (동그라미)	Choi Yu-ree	Yes	Yes	Yes
February 24, 2020	"Shape" (동그라미)	Circle (동그라미)	Choi Yu-ree	Yes	Yes	Yes
February 24, 2020	"Reason" (매일을 물어요)	Circle (동그라미)	Choi Yu-ree	Yes	Yes	Yes
February 24, 2020	"Warmhearted" (모닥불)	Circle (동그라미)	Choi Yu-ree	Yes	Yes	Yes
June 4, 2020	"Home" (동네)	Home (동네)	Choi Yu-ree	Yes	Yes	Yes
September 20, 2020	"Reply" (답장)	Reply (답장)	Choi Yu-ree	Yes	Yes	Yes
December 15, 2020	"Pond" (연못)	At Least Only We (우리만은)	Choi Yu-ree	Yes	Yes	Yes
December 15, 2020	"Mom" (옛날비)	At Least Only We (우리만은)	Choi Yu-ree	Yes	Yes	Yes
December 15, 2020	"At Least Only We" (우리만은)	At Least Only We (우리만은)	Choi Yu-ree	Yes	Yes	Yes
December 15, 2020	"Monologue" (혼잣말)	At Least Only We (우리만은)	Choi Yu-ree	Yes	Yes	Yes
April 13, 2021	"Still" (그래도)	Us (둘이)	Choi Yu-ree	Yes	Yes	Yes
April 13, 2021	"Hide and Seek" (술래잡기)	Us (둘이)	Choi Yu-ree	Yes	Yes	Yes
April 13, 2021	"Us" (둘이)	Us (둘이)	Choi Yu-ree	Yes	Yes	Yes
April 13, 2021	"Be My Day" (날아)	Us (둘이)	Choi Yu-ree	Yes	Yes	Yes
April 13, 2021	"Love" (사랑)	Us (둘이)	Choi Yu-ree	Yes	Yes	Yes
July 14, 2021	"Let's Stay Well" (잘 지내자, 우리)	Let's Stay Well (잘 지내자, 우리)	Choi Yu-ree	Sung Yoong-wok & Cho Eun-young	Sung Yoong-wok	Yes
September 25, 2021	"Wish" (바람)	Hometown Cha-Cha-Cha OST Part 3	Choi Yu-ree	Yes	Yes	Yes
October 5, 2021	"And" (끝)	Journey (여정)	Choi Yu-ree	Yes	Yes	Yes
October 5, 2021	"Life Goes On" (살아간다)	Journey (여정)	Choi Yu-ree	Yes	Yes	Yes
October 5, 2021	"I Owe You" (당신은 누구시길래)	Journey (여정)	Choi Yu-ree	Yes	Yes	Yes
October 5, 2021	"Dejavu" (데자뷰)	Journey (여정)	Choi Yu-ree	Yes	Yes	Yes
November 1, 2021	"Soothing" (툭)	Muse On 2021 Compilation	Choi Yu-ree	Yes	Yes	Yes
December 16, 2021	"Try" (감당)	Journey Epilogue (여정 에필로그)	Choi Yu-ree	Yes	Yes	Yes
March 16, 2022	"Sleepless Nights" (답답한 새벽)	My Swedish Laundry (나의 스웨덴세탁소)	Choi Yu-ree	Yes	Yes	Yes
May 3, 2022	"No More Encore" (앵콜요청금지)	O'PENing Shared Office Hookup OST	Choi Yu-ree	Yoon Deok-won	Yoon Deok-won	Han Jae-wan
April 13, 2021	"Lost" (미아)	To the Other Side of Greed (욕심의 반대편으로)	Choi Yu-ree	Yes	Yes	Yes
April 13, 2021	"To the Other Side of Greed" (욕심의 반대편으로)	To the Other Side of Greed (욕심의 반대편으로)	Choi Yu-ree	Yes	Yes	Yes with Choi Ho-jin
April 13, 2021	"Do My Best" (노력)	To the Other Side of Greed (욕심의 반대편으로)	Choi Yu-ree	Yes	Yes	Yes with Choi Ho-jin
April 13, 2021	"It's Me" (나야)	To the Other Side of Greed (욕심의 반대편으로)	Choi Yu-ree	Yes	Yes	Yes with Choi Ho-jin
April 13, 2021	"Friend" (단짝)	To the Other Side of Greed (욕심의 반대편으로)	Choi Yu-ree	Yes	Yes	Yes with Choi Ho-jin
March 3, 2022	"That's All" (이것밖에)	Thirty-Nine OST Part 3	Choi Yu-ree	Yes	Yes	Yes
August 24, 2022	"Forest" (숲)	Yoo-young (유영)	Choi Yu-ree	Yes	Yes	Yes with Moon Ji-hyeok
August 24, 2022	"Ocean" (바다)	Yoo-young (유영)	Choi Yu-ree	Yes	Yes	Yes
September 7, 2022	"I'll Protect You" (나의 품에 숨겨줄게)	If You Wish Upon Me OST Part 6	Choi Yu-ree	Park Kang-il	Park Kang-il	Kim Kyu-beom & Park Kang-il
October 5, 2022	"Tonight" (연락하고 싶은 이 밤)	Tipping Point Part 1	Choi Yu-ree, Lee Min-hyuk	Lee Min-hyuk	Lee Min-hyuk	Lee Min-hyuk
November 30, 2022	"Trace" (흔적)	Afterglow (여운)	Choi Yu-ree	Yes	Yes	Yes
November 30, 2022	"A Breath" (한 숨)	Afterglow (여운)	Choi Yu-ree	Yes	Yes	Yes
November 30, 2022	"Hey" (저기야)	Afterglow (여운)	Choi Yu-ree	Yes	Yes	Yes
November 30, 2022	"What Do You Think of Me?" (어떤가요)	Afterglow (여운)	Choi Yu-ree	Yes	Yes	Yes
November 30, 2022	"Sudden Worries" (걱정의 문득)	Afterglow (여운)	Choi Yu-ree	Yes	Yes	Yes

== Filmography ==
=== Music video ===
Publishing date	Song title	Album title	Performer	Note(s)
October 24, 2019	"Awkward" (어색한 사이)	Shofar Music Compilation Vol.3, Awkward relationship (쇼파르뮤직 컴필레이션 Vol.3 '어색한 사이)	Choi Yu-ree (with BOL4, Vanilla Acoustic, Sweden Laundry, 20 Years of Age, Letter Flow, Kim Ji-soo, WH3N, Boramiyu, Yuri)	MV
June 4, 2020	"Home"(동네)	Home (동네)	Choi Yu-ree	MV
September 20, 2020	"Reply" (답장)	Reply (답장)	Choi Yu-ree	Live clip
December 15, 2020	"Pond" (연못)	Only Us (우리만은)	Choi Yu-ree	Live clip
December 15, 2020	"Old rain" (옛날비)	Only Us (우리만은)	Choi Yu-ree	Live clip
December 15, 2020	"Only Us" (우리만은)	Only Us (우리만은)	Choi Yu-ree	Live clip
December 15, 2020	"Soliloquy" (혼잣말)	Only Us (우리만은)	Choi Yu-ree	Live clip
April 13, 2021	"The Two" (둘이)	The Two (둘이)	Choi Yu-ree	MV
July 14, 2021	"Let's get along, we" (잘 지내자, 우리)	Let's get along, we (잘 지내자, 우리)	Choi Yu-ree	MV
October 5, 2021	"Live goes on" (살아간다)	Journey (여정)	Choi Yu-ree	MV
November 1, 2021	"Soothing" (툭)	MUSE ON 2021 Compilation	Choi Yu-ree	
December 16, 2021	"Try" (감당)	Journey epilogue (여정 에필로그)	Choi Yu-ree	Lyric video
March 7, 2022	"That's All" (이것밖에)	Thirty-Nine OST Part 3	Jeon Mi-do, Son Ye-jin, Kim Ji-hyun	MV
March 16, 2022	"Stuffy Dawn" (답답한 새벽)	My swedish laundry (나의 스웨덴세탁소)	Choi Yu-ree	MV
April 13, 2021	"To the other side of greed" (욕심의 반대편으로)	To the other side of greed (욕심의 반대편으로)	Choi Yu-ree	MV
June 23, 2021	"Love flows" (지나가요)	Come with me	20 Years of Age, Choi Yu-ree	Live clip
June 2022	"Won't Give-up"	Shooting Stars OST Part 5	Lee Sung-kyung, Kim Young-dae	MV
August 24, 2022	"Tree" (숲)	Yoo-young (유영)	Choi Yu-ree	Lyric video
August 24, 2022	"Ocean" (바다)	Yoo-young (유영)	Choi Yu-ree	Lyric video
October 5, 2022	"Tonight I want to keep in touch with you" (연락하고 싶은 이 밤)	Tipping Point Part 1	Choi Yu-ree, Lee Min-hyuk	MV

== Concert ==
Concert performance(s)
Date	Title	Venue	Ref
2020	Choi Yu-ree' first solo live	Cafe Unplugged (Hongdae)	
May 2021	Choi Yu-ree' first solo concert: Prologue	KT&G Sangsangmadang Hongdae Live Hall	
August 2021	MUSE ON Day No. 2		
2021	Post-in by Yun Dahn Dahn	Sogang University Mary Hall Grand Theater	
November 2021	Choi Yu-ree' EP album release commemorative concert 'Journey'	KT&G Sangsangmadang Daechi Art Hall	
February 2022	Tune Up Stage [Sweet Love: Choi Yu-ree' X WH3N]	CJ Azit Gwangheungchang	
May 2022	Beautiful Mint Life 2022	Olympic Park	
June 2022	Choi Yu-ree' EP release commemorative solo concert 'To the other side of greed'	Shinhan pLay Square Live Hall	
August 2022	The CJ Cultural Foundation 'Dear My Playlist'	CJ Azit Gwangheungchang	
October 2022	'LIVE. ON' Day 2		
December 2022	Choi Yu-ree' solo concert 'Aftertaste'	Yonsei University Centennial Hall Concert Hall	

== Ambassadorship ==
- Public Relations Ambassador of Pyeongchang-gun, Gangwon Province, South Korea.

== Accolades ==
Awards and nominations received by Choi
Award ceremony	Year	Category	Nominee	Result	Ref.
Mnet Asian Music Awards	2021	Best OST	Choi Yu-ree — "Wish"	Nominated	
29th Yoo Jae-ha Music Contest	2018	Grand Prize	Choi Yu-ree — "Complaint"	Won	
Brand Customer Loyalty Award (Note: Co-organized by the Korean Customers Council and Brand Keys, this event recognizes the most influential brands in society and culture, as determined through consumer research.)	2024	Female Vocalist Award	Choi Yu-ree	Won	
Brand Customer Loyalty Award	2026	Female Vocalist Award	Choi Yu-ree	Won	
