= Hometown Cha-Cha-Cha =

2021 South Korean television series

- Promotional poster
- Hangul: 갯마을 차차차
- Lit.: Seaside Village Chachacha
- RR: Gaenmaeul chachacha
- MR: Kaenmaŭl ch'ach'ach'a
- Genre: Comedy drama; Romantic comedy; Slice of life
- Based on: Mr. Handy, Mr. Hong by Kang Seok-beom and Shin Jung-goo
- Developed by: Kim Je-hyeon (tvN); Studio Dragon
- Written by: Shin Ha-eun
- Directed by: Yoo Je-won; Kwon Yong-il
- Starring: Shin Min-a; Kim Seon-ho; Lee Sang-yi
- Composer: Lim Ha-young
- Country of origin: South Korea
- Original language: Korean
- No. of episodes: 16

Production
- Executive producer: Jo Moon-ju
- Producers: Lee Dong-gyu; Lee Sang-hee
- Cinematography: Park Jung-hoon
- Editors: Kim In-young; Cha Young-ah
- Running time: 60 minutes
- Production companies: Studio Dragon; GTist

Original release
- Network: tvN
- Release: August 28 – October 17, 2021

Hometown Cha-Cha-Cha (Korean: 갯마을 차차차) is a 2021 South Korean romantic comedy television series starring Shin Min-a, Kim Seon-ho and Lee Sang-yi. It is a remake of the 2004 South Korean film Mr. Handy, Mr. Hong. It aired on tvN from August 28 to October 17, 2021, every Saturday and Sunday at 21:00 (KST). It is also available for streaming on Netflix.

The series achieved peak nationwide ratings of 12.665 percent, making it into the list of highest-rated series on Korean cable television. It also became one of Netflix's top Korean programs of 2021, charting in the Top 10 across more than 20 countries and remaining on the global non-English weekly charts for 16 consecutive weeks.

The series was credited for transforming Pohang into a major Hallyu pilgrimage destination. Featured locations, including the boat display at Sabang Memorial Park and the Squid Statue at Cheongha Gongjin Market, attracted large numbers of tourists, leading to municipal infrastructure investments. The Korea Tourism Organization later featured the locations on its Visit Korea website and incorporated them into national tourism campaigns.

== Premise ==
Yoon Hye-jin, a dentist from Seoul, arrives in the seaside village of Gongjin on her late mother’s birthday after her career and personal life fall apart. While stranded there, she meets Hong Du-sik, a local handyman known as Hong Banjang. She later decides to open a dental clinic in the village. As their relationship develops, the series also follows the everyday lives of Gongjin's residents and gradually uncovers the village's three biggest mysteries: the reason for Du-sik's five-year absence, the truth behind Yeong-guk and Hwa-jeong's divorce, and the identity of the lottery winner.

== Cast ==
=== Main ===
- Shin Min-a as Yoon Hye-jin:

A confident self made dentist with a strong sense of righteousness. Though she appears privileged, she grew up in a modest household and worked hard to succeed. After an unexpected turn of events derails her plans in Seoul, she moves to the seaside village of Gongjin to open her own dental clinic.
- Shim Hye-yeon as child Yoon Hye-jin.
- Oh Ye-ju as teenage Yoon Hye-jin.

- Kim Seon-ho as Hong Du-sik:

Gongjin's beloved neighborhood handyman, affectionately known as Hong Banjang. Officially unemployed, he supports himself by taking on various odd jobs for minimum wage and is always ready to help the villagers with any task. Though warm and reliable, he harbors a mysterious five-year gap in his past that sparks endless rumors.
- Song Min-jae as child Hong Du-sik.
- An Seong-won as a young teenage Hong Du-sik.
- Moon Seong-hyun as teenage Hong Du-sik

- Lee Sang-yi as Ji Seong-hyun (Ji PD):

A star director known for producing multiple hit variety shows. Though a workaholic, he is easygoing, popular among his colleagues, and deeply passionate about food. He arrives in Gongjin while scouting locations for a new show. He went to the same university with Hye-jin.

=== Supporting ===
==== People around Yoon Hye-jin ====
- Gong Min-jeung as Pyo Mi-seon. Hye-jin's best friend since middle school and a skilled, ten-year veteran dental hygienist who joins Hye-jin's clinic in Gongjin. Known for her eccentric personality and unfiltered honesty, she is a hopeless romantic who falls in love at first sight with police officer Choi Eun-cheol.
- Seo Sang-won as Yoon Tae-hwa, Hye-jin's reserved and serious father. Widowed for years after the death of Hye-jin's mother, he remarried Lee Myung-shin once Hye-jin entered university, and spends his retirement tending orchids and playing Go.
- Woo Mi-hwa as Lee Myung-shin, Hye-jin's stepmother. Known for her sharp, assertive, and cheerful demeanor, she is a former cook who currently dedicates her time to community volunteer work.

==== People around Ji Seong-hyun ====
- Park Ye-young as Wang Ji-won, the head writer of the Seaside Village Grasshopper. Having worked with Ji PD for seven years, she is his creative partner who brings his ideas to life. She handles all production logistics, from site scouting to location management, while looking after Ji PD, who is clueless about life outside of work.
- Lee Suk-hyeong as Kim Do-ha, the assistant director of the Seaside Village Grasshopper. Born in the 1990s, he struggles to maintain a work-life balance amidst the station's grueling schedule. Though he views Ji PD as his role model, he secretly envies Du-sik's free-spirited lifestyle.
- Seong Tae as June, main rapper of idol group DOS and cast member of the Seaside Village Grasshopper. Combining natural talent with a strong work ethic, he is known for his strict self-discipline. He shares a brotherly bond with Ji PD after appearing on his previous show.
- Baek Seung as In-woo, sub-vocalist of idol group DOS and a cast member of the Seaside Village Grasshopper. Handsome with an innocent charm, he is known as the idol world's "nation's first love." He is friendly, cheerful, and easily warms up to strangers.

==== People in Gongjin ====
- Kim Young-ok as Kim Gam-ri. A village elder, spiritual pillar of Gongjin, and leader of the local grandmother trio. A former haenyeo, she supported her family by diving for seafood and preparing fish and squid. She was named after the "gam" and "ri" trigrams of the South Korean flag by her father, an independence activist who served in the Korean Liberation Army. Her favorite food is squid.
- Lee Yong-yi as Lee Mat-yi. The second-oldest member of the grandmother trio. Formerly working at a pollack drying yard, she is now retired and spends her days socializing. Having worked with fish her entire life, she has a habit of bathing frequently. Despite being born an eldest daughter, she defers to Gam-ri while asserting authority over the youngest member, Sook-ja.
- Shin Shin-ae as Park Sook-ja. The youngest member of the grandmother trio. Having married into the village fifty years prior, she speaks primarily in the standard Seoul dialect. She resents being treated as the youngest, sometimes ignoring phone calls from Gam-ri and Mat-yi before eventually seeking out their company out of boredom.
- Jo Han-chul as Oh Cheon-jae. The owner of the live cafe "Coffee in the Day, Beer at Night" and a former singer. Performing under the stage name Oh Yoon, he rose to prominence with a single hit song in the 1990s, peaking at second place behind Seo Taiji and Boys before fading from the industry. A widower raising a daughter, Ju-ri, he remains fixated on his past fame and hopes to be invited onto the television program Sugar People.
- Lee Bong-ryun as Yeo Hwa-jeong. The three-term neighborhood chief (tongjang) of Gongjin-dong's 5th District. A Gongjin native, she owns a raw fish restaurant and several properties. She divorced her childhood friend, Yeong-guk, three years prior, maintaining an amicable relationship until his appointment as the youngest town head (dongjang) sparks frequent clashes.
- In Gyo-jin as Jang Young-guk. The town head (dongjang) of Gongjin-dong. Starting his career as a Grade 7 civil servant, he became Cheongho City's youngest town head the previous year. Following a divorce from Hwa-jeong three years earlier, he strives to co-parent their son, I-jun.
- Hong Ji-hee as Yoo Cho-hui. A gentle, soft-spoken teacher at Cheongjin Elementary School. Fifteen years earlier, her teaching assignment brought her to Gongjin, where she boarded at Hwa-jeong's house and befriended both Hwa-jeong and Yeong-guk. She returns to the village as she approaches forty.
- Cha Chung-hwa as Jo Nam-sook. Owner of the Chinese restaurant Gongjin Banjeom and president of the local merchants’ association. She has a long-running friendly rivalry with Hwa-jeong. Because she started school a year early, they were classmates all the way through, and she still likes to remind people that she is actually a year younger. She is the village’s biggest gossip.
- Yoon Seok-hyun as Choi Geum-cheol. The owner of Cheongho Hardware Store and Du-sik's friend. After moving to Seoul immediately following high school graduation, he returned to Gongjin a year later broke. He is married to Yun-kyeong. He quietly overcharges customers by small amounts to build a secret cash stash, though Du-sik always seems to notice.
- Kim Ju-yeon as Ham Yun-kyeong. The owner of Bo-ra Supermarket and Geum-cheol's wife. Outwardly a quiet, soft-spoken homemaker who enjoys knitting, she was once Gongjin's juvenile delinquent before settling down with Geum-cheol. Though she leaves her rebellious past behind, her old temperament occasionally resurfaces. She is pregnant with her second child.
- Kang Hyung-suk as Choi Eun-cheol. A diligent police officer at the Gongjin Police Substation and Geum-cheol's younger brother. After studying fifteen hours a day to pass the civil service exam, he became an earnest and literal-minded officer. His seriousness has left him with no dating experience despite his handsome appearance.
- Kim Sung-bum as Ban Yong-hoon. An administrative officer at the Gongjin-dong Community Service Center. Serving as both Yeong-guk's right-hand man and frequent critic, he favors stability and dislikes change. He is constantly troubled by Du-sik's frequent visits to the center and his own habit of accidentally addressing Hwa-jeong as samonim.
- Kim Min-seo as Oh Ju-ri. Chun-jae's fourteen-year-old daughter. A rebellious middle schooler going through puberty, she is indifferent to academics and habitually ignores or talks back to her father. She is a devoted fan of the idol group DOS and aspires to become their stylist.
- Ki Eun-yoo as Jang I-jun, Yeong-guk and Hwa-jeong's son, born after five years of marriage. Mature and scholarly from a young age, he enjoys calligraphy and frequently uses four-character idioms (sajaseongeo). Because he rarely shows emotion, his parents go out of their way to make him laugh. Despite their different personality, his closest friend is Bo-ra.
- Go Do-yeon as Choi Bo-ra, Geum-cheol and Yun-kyeong's elementary-school-aged daughter. She is a tomboy with a bright and energetic personality. She prefers wearing a taekwondo uniform and dancing over dressing up like other girls her age. Her closest friend is I-jun.

=== Special appearances ===
- Lee Jung-eun as Hye-jin's patient.
- Bae Hae-sun as the head doctor at Hye-jin's former dental clinic.
- Lee Jin-hee as Hye-jin's mother.
- Lee Ho-jae as Du-sik's grandfather.
- Lee Si-hoon as Myung-hak, a patient at Hye-jin's dental clinic.
- Kim Jin-yeop as Lee Kang-wook, Hye-jin's ex-boyfriend and Ji Seong-hyeon's high school classmate.
- Kim Dae-gon as rotisserie chicken street vendor.
- Kim Ji-hyun as Ji Seon-ah, Seong-hyun's cousin and Jung-woo's wife.
- Oh Eui-shik as Park Jung-woo, Du-sik's friend whom he met during college days.
- Lee Do-yeop as Gam-ri's son.
- Shim Jin-hwa as a customer at Nam-sook's restaurant.
- Jo Young-seo as main dancer of DOS.
- Kim Do-kyun as lead dancer of DOS.

== Episodes ==
Ref:

No.	Title	Original release date	South Korea viewers (millions)
1	"The moment I met you everywhere" Transliteration: "Tangsinŭi mosŭbŭl, ŏdisŏna mannan sun'gan" (Korean: 당신의 모습을, 어디서나 만난 순간)	August 28, 2021	1.670
Yoon Hye-jin is an accomplished dentist working at a clinic in Gangnam and living in a nice apartment nearby. After refusing to perform expensive, unnecessary treatments on a patient, she argues with her boss and gets fired. After a drunken online rant gets her blacklisted in Seoul, she visits the seaside village of Gongjin on her late mother's birthday. At the beach, the tide sweeps away her heels. A surfer returns one of her heels and nonchalantly gives his sandals. Later, Hye-jin helps an injured boy, leading his grateful mother, restaurant owner Hwa-jeong, to treat her to lunch. Stranded without cash due to a flat tire and a blackout, Hye-jin bumps into the surfer again. He helps her earn money cleaning squid with the village's grandmothers so she can afford a night at a public sauna. The next morning, her former boss offers her job back if she begs. Furious, Hye-jin impulsively decides to open her own clinic in Gongjin. Asking Hwa-jeong for rental leads, she is directed to a local handyman named Hong Banjang, who turns out to be the surfer. In the epilogue, Du-sik is shown surfing while observing Hye-jin from afar. He notices that she looks sad at the beach. While returning from the beach, he sees her helping I-jun. He smiles as he watches her clean squid with the village's grandmothers.
2	"The moment your sincerity took a step forward" Transliteration: "Tangsinŭi chinsimi, hanbaltchak naagan sun'gan" (Korean: 당신의 진심이, 한발짝 나아간 순간)	August 29, 2021	1.624
Du-sik shows Hye-jin two properties owned by Hwa-jeong. After hesitating, she rents them and hires Du-sik as her contractor once he flashes his stack of licenses. At a village hall gathering, she grows uncomfortable as Oh Cheon-jae brags about his 1990s singing career. While complaining about him on the phone to her friend Pyo Mi-seon, Hye-jin accidentally broadcasts her rant over the village loudspeakers. The next day, after her break-up, Mi-seon arrives to move in and work as Hye-jin's dental hygienist. However, Hye-jin's ruined reputation keeps patients away, and her attempt to hand out rice cakes is met with cold shoulders. She meets I-jun and Bo-ra and agrees to take care of their pet hedgehog, Seumseumi. Mi-seon suggests giving up and returning to Seoul. Du-sik steps in to repair Hye-jin's image. He brings her to a village meeting and hands out snacks on her behalf. When Hye-jin tries to skip the monthly village cleanup by faking a fever, Du-sik sees right through her lie and makes her join. Soon after, the clinic finally welcomes its first patient. Finally, Hye-jin apologizes to Cheon-jae, sincerely praising one of his songs. A flashback of their childhood on Gongjin's beach is shown in the epilogue. Hye-jin's father asks Du-sik's grandfather to take their family photo. Little Du-sik makes funny gestures to make little Hye-jin smile. His grandfather asks Du-sik to take their own family photo later.
3	"The moment your heart smiled at me" Transliteration: "Tangsinŭi maŭmi, naege misojiŭn sun'gan" (Korean: 당신의 마음이, 내게 미소지은 순간)	September 4, 2021	2.126
To find the perfect outfit for a college classmate's wedding, Hye-jin goes on an online shopping spree, drawing criticism from Du-sik, who repeatedly delivers her packages. As she is about to leave for Seoul, Du-sik unexpectedly arrives with three grandmothers needing a ride. Hye-jin reluctantly agrees, enduring a trip marked by frequent bathroom breaks. At the wedding, Hye-jin's friends question her decision to open a clinic in Gongjin. Du-sik is waiting for her, and Hye-jin quickly drags him away so her friends will not see them together. On the drive back, the two argue over whether Gongjin's or Seoul's lifestyle is superior. A few days later, Du-sik rushes to the clinic with Gam-ri on his back. However, she refuses further treatment due to the high cost and declines Du-sik's offer to pay. After Du-sik reminds her to stay healthy for her children and Hye-jin visits to offer a discount, Gam-ri finally agrees. Later, Du-sik drops by Hye-jin's house during a blackout. After he leaves, Hye-jin discovers her missing heel neatly placed on her shoe rack, happily slipping it on while asking him where he found it. In the epilogue, while fishing, Du-sik finds Hye-jin's other high heel. He carefully dries it and later secretly places it on her shoe rack.
4	"The moment your temperature melted my heart" Transliteration: "Tangsinŭi ondoga, naŭi maŭmŭl nogin sun'gan" (Korean: 당신의 온도가, 나의 마음을 녹인 순간)	September 5, 2021	2.232
Having grown used to Du-sik’s constant presence, Hye-jin notices his absence. Later, Hye-jin accepts Nam-sook's invitation to a Shopkeepers' Association meeting once she hears Du-sik is attending. Feeling out of place, she fakes drunkenness, sneaking peeks while Du-sik sings. Seeing right through her act, Du-sik piggybacks her home. The next day, Hye-jin and Ju-ri bond over a photo of DOS member June while Du-sik nags them. When a patient harasses Mi-seon at the clinic, Hye-jin kicks him, and Du-sik arrives to deliver a flying kick. Both are briefly detained at the police station, where a crying Mi-seon rushes in to hug Hye-jin. In gratitude, Hye-jin brings expensive wine to Du-sik's house. Over drinks, he asks why she visited Gongjin's beach the day they met. Elsewhere in Gongjin, Yeong-guk discovers his first love, Cho-hui, has returned to teach at Gongjin Elementary School. In the evening, famous variety show producer Ji PD visits Oh Yoon's cafe with a friend. The epilogue shows that after surfing, Du-sik receives a call from Gam-ri about an incident at the dental clinic. He hurries there, passing Hwa-jeong, Nam-sook, and Geum-cheol on the way.
5	"The moment your feelings floated on the waves" Transliteration: "Tangsinŭi kamjŏngi, p'adoë ttŏorŭn sun'gan" (Korean: 당신의 감정이, 파도에 떠오른 순간)	September 11, 2021	2.490
Gossip spreads in Gongjin after Nam-sook spots Hye-jin leaving Du-sik's house in the morning, even though Hye-jin was drunk the night before and barely remembers what happened. Hye-jin tries to talk to Du-sik over breakfast, while noticing that the villagers spy on them. After their meal, Hye-jin tells Du-sik that they come from completely different social backgrounds. Later at the clinic, Mi-seon reveals that Du-sik actually graduated from Seoul National University, though his missing five years in Seoul remain one of Gongjin's three big mysteries, alongside Yeong-guk and Hwa-jeong's divorce reason and the identity of Gongjin's lottery winner. Elsewhere, Du-sik rescues a man just in time before he falls to the sea. He introduces himself as Ji PD, who surveys Gongjin for his future television program. Hye-jin crosses paths with Du-sik again when Mi-seon hires him to help out during a dental visit at Gongjin's elementary school, and they grab lunch afterward. When it starts raining as they leave the restaurant, Du-sik grabs Hye-jin's hand and pulls her to play on the beach. Hye-jin suddenly remembers their kiss from the night before and becomes angry that Du-sik has been acting as if nothing happened. The epilogue reveals that when Du-sik hitched a ride into town in Hye-jin's car in episode three, it was to visit his psychiatrist. Later, during the night they spend together, he suffers from nightmares before waking up to find Hye-jin sleeping beside him.
6	"The moment your gaze goes beyond friendship" Transliteration: "Tangsinŭi sisŏni, ujŏngŭl nŏmŏsŏn sun'gan" (Korean: 당신의 시선이, 우정을 넘어선 순간)	September 12, 2021	2.593
Still upset about the kiss, Hye-jin tries to avoid Du-sik. He comes to her clinic as a patient and calls the kiss a "biological crisis" they need to get over. Annoyed, Hye-jin leaves him under Mi-seon's care. A few days later, the town holds the "Lighthouse Song Festival." Nam-sook, Geum-cheol, Gam-ri and the grandmother duo all compete for the prize money. Juri plans to cover a song by her favorite idol group, DOS. She wants to fix snaggletooth with the prize money. When she struggles to perform due to her sprained ankle, Hye-jin and Du-sik jump in as her backup dancers, helping her win second place behind Bo-ra. Hye-jin later offers Ju-ri a big discount for her braces. At the end of the festival, DOS makes a surprise appearance. After the festival, Du-sik and Hye-jin admire fireworks together. Someone pushes Du-sik by accident. When he nearly falls to the sea, both Hye-jin and Ji PD swiftly catch him. The epilogue shows a flashback. A teenage Hye-jin runs away to Gongjin and meets Du-sik at a convenience store. The two later sit side by side on the beach.
7	"The moment your loneliness leaned on me" Transliteration: "Tangsinŭi oeroumi, naëge kidaeon sun'gan" (Korean: 당신의 외로움이, 나에게 기대온 순간)	September 18, 2021	2.321
Gongjin becomes the filming location for Ji PD's new show, Seaside Grasshopper and he recruits Du-sik as a local guide. At a kickoff dinner with the villagers, Hye-jin leaves early; Ji PD offers to walk her home, and Du-sik tags along. The three end up drinking at Du-sik's house, and Nam-sook spots them leaving together the next morning. Despite getting along with Ji PD, Du-sik grows jealous of his closeness to Hye-jin and his overly helpful attitude toward the villagers. Meanwhile, Ji PD tries to persuade Gam-ri to rent her house for filming by doing her household chores. She eventually agrees. She asks Du-sik to wash her blanket, and he ropes a passing Hye-jin into doing the laundry with him. Later, Ji PD arrives with his friend June, an idol from the group DOS, and Ju-ri rushes over after Hye-jin calls her. They all share a meal together, leaving Gam-ri overjoyed since it has been a long time since her house was so full of people. The epilogue shows Hye-jin heads out from Du-sik's house. She finds Du-sik sitting outside, where he drunkenly begs her not to leave him.
8	"The moment your existence erases the darkness" Transliteration: "Tangsinŭi chonjaega, ŏdumŭl chiunŭn sun'gan" (Korean: 당신의 존재가, 어둠을 지우는 순간)	September 19, 2021	2.106
Wearing a neck brace for a herniated disc, Hye-jin visits Bora Supermarket, where cashier Du-sik learns of her condition. The next morning, Hye-jin clashes with Nam-sook after discovering she has been diverting her patients to a cheaper but unlicensed technician. The villagers of Meanwhile, safety concern rise in Gongjin after Hwa-jeong rescues Cho-hui from an attempted kidnapping, prompting Yeong-guk to rush to the hospital. Worried for Hye-jin's safety, Ji PD walks her home in the rain, where they find Du-sik waiting to gift her acanthopanax for her neck pain. Later, during her morning run, Hye-jin spots a conman stealing Nam-sook's money. Du-sik and Ji PD join her pursuit, and together they catch the thief. After Hye-jin cares for an unwell Du-sik at his home, she runs into a grateful Nam-sook, who apologizes to her. One night, sensing she is being followed, a frightened Hye-jin runs until she spots Du-sik waiting near her house, rushing into his arms for a hug. In the epilogue, Hye-jin sits beside Du-sik as he sleeps on the sofa and nearly kisses him. It is later revealed that he was pretending to be asleep.
9	"Your seat, the moment you draw your daily life" Transliteration: "Tangsinŭi chariga, ilsangŭl kŭrinŭn sun'gan" (Korean: 당신의 자리가, 일상을 그리는 순간)	September 25, 2021	2.397
When Nam-sook asks Hye-jin about her hugging Du-sik last night, her parents, who have just arrived in Gongjin, overhear the conversation. When they enter her house, Du-sik appears from the bathroom. He is there to fix things. This awkward situation leads Du-sik to pretend to be her boyfriend. Hye-jin messages the villagers to cooperate with this pretense. Tension rises when Ji PD also tries his best to make a good impression in front of Hye-jin's father. They have a lunch together, where Hye-jin's father learns that Du-sik is an orphan and expresses his disapproval. Overhearing the conversation, Du-sik ends up clarifying to Hye-jin's father that he and Hye-jin are just friends. After her parents left, Hye-jin follows Du-sik to his boat. She asks him questions about his past and his future plans. Du-sik answers vaguely. Meanwhile, Mi-seon asks Eun-cheol for a ride. Mi-seon confesses her feelings to Eun-cheol, only to be rejected. In the cafe, Cho-hui turns down Yeong-guk's advances. A flashback shows one of Du-sik's therapy sessions, followed by scenes of him as a teenager at his grandfather's funeral and, later, at another funeral as an adult. He tells his therapist that everyone he has ever loved has left him.
10	"The moment your love reaches 'us'" Transliteration: "Tangsinŭi sarangi, 'uri'e todarhan sun'gan" (Korean: 당신의 사랑이, '우리'에 도달한 순간)	September 26, 2021	2.978
Du-sik rescues Hye-jin from a house intruder, taking down the culprit while suffering a knife wound to his arm. After his hospital treatment, an overwhelmed Hye-jin bursts into tears. Meanwhile, Eun-cheol drives Mi-seon to a Seoul hospital for her mother's surgery, telling her he wants to stay by her side. Too afraid to be alone, Hye-jin stays at Du-sik's house, where he shares memories of his late grandfather. Hye-jin accompanies Du-sik to prepare the jesa (death ceremony) of his grandfather. On her way home, she runs into Ji PD. Ji PD confesses his feelings for her. The next day, Hye-jin and Mi-seon drive to Seoul. The next day, while driving to Seoul with Mi-seon, Hye-jin realizes she left her curling iron on. Mi-seon calls Du-sik, who takes care of it and then installs new window locks. After shopping, Hye-jin and Mi-seon dine at a fancy restaurant. As they leave, it starts raining and Hye-jin decides to make a run for it. Reminded of Du-sik, she rushes back to Gongjin, confesses her feelings to him, and they share their first kiss. The epilogue shows a flashback of Du-sik's teenage birthday. When he blows the candles, his grandfather wishes for the boy to meet a good person in the future. Fast forward to Du-sik finds Hye-jin's family portrait, eventually remembering their childhood meeting.
11	"The moment when your excitement becomes my happiness" Transliteration: "Tangsinŭi sŏllemi, naŭi haengbogi toenŭn sun'gan" (Korean: 당신의 설렘이, 나의 행복이 되는 순간)	October 2, 2021	2.438
After their kiss, they walk hand in hand to Hye-jin's house. In front of the house, Hye-jin asks how much he likes her. Du-sik says that it's as deep as Lake Baikal. Hye-jin says that they can't date just yet until she officially rejects him. That night, Hye-jin calls Du-sik first to talk about the lake, while Du-sik points out that he was the one who took their family photo in the past. Hye-jin politely rejects Ji PD at Oh Yoon's café. After they start dating, Hye-jin asks Du-sik to keep their relationship a secret. Trying to hide it leads to a string of comedic moments where Du-sik repeatedly gets hit by Hye-jin as she pretends to hate him. Meanwhile, heartbroken Ji PD falls ill. Writer Wang, who secretly has feelings for him, takes care of him. After Du-sik loses his phone and becomes difficult to contact, Hye-jin grows frustrated and decides to make their relationship public. The residents of Gongjin, however, already know about them. In the epilogue, Hye-jin recalls meeting Du-sik as a child while looking at her childhood drawing of a princess and prince on the beach. At the same time, Du-sik marks their first day as a couple on his calendar.
12	"The moment your wish dreams of 'together'" Transliteration: "Tangsinŭi parami, 'hamkke'rŭl kkumkkunŭn sun'gan" (Korean: 당신의 바람이, '함께'를 꿈꾸는 순간)	October 3, 2021	2.776
Du-sik dreams of happily spending time with Hye-jin before everything goes dark and another version of himself questions his happiness. Waking up from the nightmare to Hye-jin's voice, he pulls her into a hug. She comes early in the morning wanting a sunrise beach date. It is part of her dating bucket list. He goes along with her plan, which includes a visit to an art museum and a shopping mall. There, Hye-jin buys Du-sik a suit and splurges on an expensive necklace for herself before they run into an old friend of Du-sik's. Over lunch, Du-sik grows quiet, which Hye-jin misinterprets as judgment over her spending. Later, Du-sik surprises her with a romantic beach date and a handcrafted jewelry box, made because he couldn't afford the necklace, only to learn she has already sold it. Hye-jin is happy with the gift. They clear up the misunderstanding and share a kiss. Elsewhere, a street vendor helps dense Eun-cheol understand Mi-seon's feelings so the two can start dating, while Yeong-guk learns the true reason Hwa-jeong divorced him over drinks at Cheon-jae's cafe. The epilogue reveals that Du-sik also writes his own bucket list. Then moves to him hand crafting a wooden jewelry box and back to a close-up of the list, the first item is revealed: "Give her a present I made myself."
13	"Your today is the moment you wish for tomorrow" Transliteration: "Tangsinŭi onŭri, naeirŭl paranŭn sun'gan" (Korean: 당신의 오늘이, 내일을 바라는 순간)	October 9, 2021	2.459
Hye-jin brings homemade seaweed soup to Du-sik’s house for his birthday, only to find the villagers already celebrating with a feast. Still, Du-sik happily eats her soup. At home, Mi-seon tastes the leftovers and complains they are too salty. When Hye-jin's college friends visit Gongjin, she introduces Du-sik as her boyfriend, leading to a golf outing where he impresses them with his skills. Afterward, Hye-jin presses him about his past, but he only mentions having worked at a company. Days later, a typhoon blocks the roads while Du-sik is driving Yun-gyeong to the hospital, forcing an emergency delivery at Hye-jin's house. Guided by Gam-ri over the phone, Hye-jin delivers the baby safely while Geum-cheol rushes to his wife's side and Bo-ra and I-jun pray. Du-sik takes an exhausted Hye-jin to his house to rest, where she asks how many children he wants before falling asleep. Later, browsing his books, Hye-jin finds a family photo. When she asks who the people are, Du-sik simply apologizes, leaving Hye-jin disappointed over him always avoiding questions about his past. The epilogue shows Bora and I-jun play with their hedgehog Seumseumi in Du-sik's house. Bora asks him why he used to refuse to watch Seumseumi. He tells her that he isn't ready to take care of another living being yet.
14	"Your promise, the moment I drew out my courage" Transliteration: "Tangsinŭi yaksogi, yonggirŭl kkŭrŏnaen sun'gan" (Korean: 당신의 약속이, 용기를 끌어낸 순간)	October 10, 2021	3.013
After their fight, Hye-jin walks out of Du-sik’s house upset and breaks down in tears when she runs into Hwa-jeong. Over breakfast, Hwa-jeong mentions that Du-sik seemed completely broken when he came back to Gongjin a few years ago, though nobody ever knew why. Needing time to think, Hye-jin asks Du-sik for some space. Later, when her stepmother sends over side dishes and tells her to share them with Du-sik, Hye-jin brings the food to his house, calls off their break, and promises to wait until he's ready to talk about his past. Encouraged by Cho-hui, Yeong-guk apologizes to Hwa-jeong and begs her to take him back. When I-jun learns they have reconciled, he runs off and is found crying alone, overwhelmed because he secretly wanted them back together for so long. The next day, the villagers gather for Ji PD's variety show wrap-up party at the village hall. Before it begins, Du-sik tells Hye-jin he is finally ready to open up about his past later that night. During the party, Do-ha overhears Du-sik's full name, confronts him regarding YK Asset Management and his father, and punches him. The epilogue reveals Du-sik's bucket list again; one of the items is a wish to be happy with Hye-jin.
15	"The moment your sadness greets spring" Transliteration: "Tangsinŭi sŭlp'ŭmi, pomŭl majihan sun'gan" (Korean: 당신의 슬픔이, 봄을 맞이한 순간)	October 16, 2021	2.652
Everyone at the party is shocked. Du-sik leaves, and Hye-jin follows to ask if Do-ha's accusation is true. He confirms it. Shocked, she breaks down crying in Mi-seon's arms at home. Du-sik's past is later fully revealed. While working at YK Asset Management in Seoul, his poor financial advice caused Do-ha's father to lose everything and suffer a stroke. On his way to see the man, Du-sik was involved in a car accident that killed his close friend, Jung-woo. After isolating himself for a while, Du-sik finally tells Hye-jin the whole story. On their way to visit Jung-woo's grave, they run into his widow Seon-ah and her son. Du-sik speaks privately with Seon-ah, who tells him they both need to move on. Later that night, Du-sik shares that he was so overwhelmed by guilt and almost jumped off a bridge. He stopped only because Gam-ri texted him right then. So he returned to Gongjin. Hye-jin tells Du-sik that she receives a job offer as a professor in Seoul. The epilogue shows a flashback of Hye-jin driving. She notices a man sitting near the bridge railing. She calls for emergency services and waits in her car until the paramedics arrive. That man is Du-sik.
16	"The moment our lives dance with everyone" Transliteration: "Uriŭi insaengi, moduwa ch'umch'unŭn sun'gan" (Korean: 우리의 인생이, 모두와 춤추는 순간)	October 17, 2021	3.237
Following the passing of Gam-ri, the residents of Gongjin come together for her funeral. Hye-jin finds a letter Gam-ri left behind, and Du-sik reads it. Gam-ri wrote that she think of Du-sik as both her son and grandson. With Hye-jin's support, Du-sik is finally able to grieve and start moving forward. Hye-jin declines a job offer as professor in Seoul. She decides to propose to Du-sik on the beach where they first met with a pair of shoes. It turns out Du-sik was planning to propose too, with the exact same necklace Hye-jin previously had sold off. After their engagement, they spend the night together at Du-sik's house. They show up late to the village's monthly chore day, where they tell everyone that they will be getting married. Hye-jin puts on her wedding dress and Du-sik wears the suit she bought him to take their wedding photos. When the villagers insist on tagging along when they take photos at Gongjin's lighthouse, the couple sneaks away to Du-sik's grandfather's boat instead. An emergency soon cuts the photoshoot short, and they run back toward the village hand in hand.

== Production ==
=== Development and planning ===
Plans to adapt the 2004 film Mr. Handy, Mr. Hong into a television series were first announced on December 21, 2020, under the working title Hong Banjang (홍반장; 'Chief Hong') with Shin Ha-eun attached as screenwriter. In her interview, it was reported that Shin initially hesitated when approached for the remake, viewing the original character of Hong Banjang as an iconic cultural touchstone whose name functions almost as "a proper noun." She worried a new version might diminish the legacy of the film and its lead actor, Kim Joo-hyuk, with whom she had previously collaborated on her first miniseries, Argon. She ultimately decided to proceed after re-watching the original film and visualizing how the character would translate to a contemporary setting. Recognizing that the source material lacked developed supporting roles, she seized the opportunity to build an ensemble of sixteen distinct villagers for the fictional setting of Gongjin, giving each a fully realized backstory. This expansion allowed the remake to establish its own identity while honoring the spirit of the original.

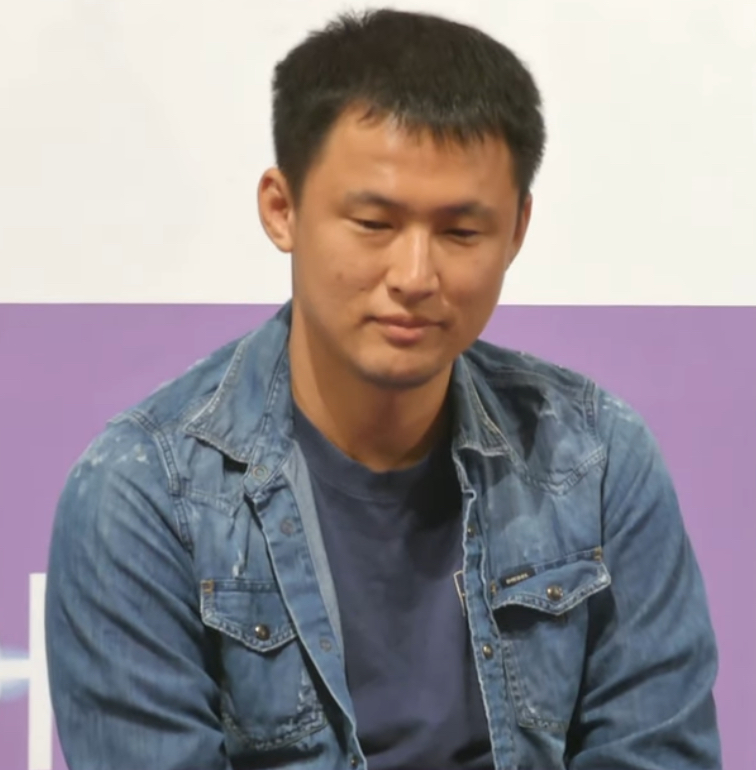
Director Yoo Je-won

Yoo Je-won was officially confirmed as director on April 2, 2021. Coproduced by Studio Dragon and its subsidiary Gtist, the drama title was subsequently changed to Gaenmaeul chachacha (갯마을 차차차; 'Seaside Village Cha-Cha-Cha'), abbreviated as Gaetcha (갯차). On June 23, 2021, Netflix officially announced the series as part of their 2021 lineup and revealed the English title as Hometown Cha‑Cha‑Cha. In the press conference, Yoo explained, "The original work focuses on Hong Banjang, as the title suggests, but since we deal with the story of the entire village, we decided on Gaenmaeul Cha-cha-cha. I like that it captures the atmosphere of the setting and incorporates the 'Cha-Cha-Cha' dance, which harmonizes with that vibe.

The art director in charge of the set was Art Director Ryu Seon-gwang, who worked with Yoo in Oh My Ghost (2015) and Tomorrow with You (2017). He explained the design foundation laid for Gongjin Village, stating, "When I first read the script, I envisioned pleasant and warm images. I began the work by listing memories of visiting my maternal grandparents' house in the countryside as a child. Warm light and things that evoke laughter without being artificial, I placed the utmost emphasis on maintaining a sense of naturalness."

=== Casting ===
Casting announcements began on December 21, 2020, when Kim Seon‑ho and Shin Min‑a were reported to have been offered roles Hong Du-sik and Yoon Hye-jin respectively. On April 2, 2021, Kim and Shin were officially confirmed as the leads. The drama marked director Yoo Je‑won's second collaboration with Shin, following Tomorrow with You (2017). On the same day, Lee Sang‑yi was also reported to have been offered a role as Ji PD. His casting was confirmed on June 3. The script reading took place in Seoul on April 21, 2021, however tvN released script readings pictures on June 14.

Shin shared that she came across the script of Hometown Cha‑Cha‑Cha when she wanted to do a romantic comedy, noting that after a while she wanted to try "something soft and fun." She added, "The story was solid, and the stories about people's lives were so entertaining. Above all, the fact that I was deeply drawn to the character of Yoon Hye-jin was a major reason for my decision." Kim also cited the script as the reason for his participation. Describing it as "a warm and humane project," he stated, "At first, I wondered how to portray an all-around unemployed person who is good at everything, but it is so much fun. I am filming without any regrets."

=== Filming ===
Principal photography was scheduled to begin on May 8. According to a representative from the Pohang Northern Police Station, filming took place inside the Cheongha Police Substation and outside of the Pohang Northern Police Station on May 22. These locations were chosen for their retro aesthetic. In June, a media reported that the primary filming locations of the drama are Cheongha Market, Cheongjin 3-ri Village Hall, Guryongpo Beach, Heunghwan-ri Beach, and Wolpo Beach. Production staff members began to build sets at Cheongha Market on June 5. The selected private residences were leased for filming, including those used for characters Yoon Hye-jin and Hong Du-sik. Filming was scheduled to finish on Wednesday, October 6, 2021, or by the end of that week.

The production team explained that the "Lighthouse Song Festival" sequence in episode six was challenging to film due to the large number of participants, unpredictable rainy-season weather, and strict COVID-19 quarantine measures. The highlight of the festival was a performance of Hye-jin and Du-sik, who served as backup dancers for Oh Ju-ri, followed by a surprise appearance from the idol group DOS, performing their hit song "Just a Feeling." Actors Seong Tae and Baek Seung rehearsed the routine for a month before filming alongside members of the real-life dance crew Dance of Soul. The choreography was created by Dance of Soul members Jo Young-seo and Kim Do-gyun, who previously choreographed for the television show Mr. Trot. Jo explained that the casting of their crew as idol members of DOS was a spontaneous decision. He added that writer Shin Ha-eun changed the fictional group's name from "Choice" to "DOS" to match their actual crew name.

== Release ==
On June 23, 2021, it was announced that the drama will be distributed by Netflix. On July 21, Netflix confirmed August 28, 2021 as the worldwide release date for the series. On July 28, the first teaser was released. The press conference was broadcast live online on August 24. Director Yoo Je-won and actors Shin Min-ah, Kim Seon-ho, and Lee Sang-yi attended the event. The series aired on tvN from August 28 to October 17, 2021, every Saturday and Sunday at 21:00 (KST). It is also available for streaming on Netflix.

== Music ==
=== Featured songs ===
The series features several on-screen song covers performed by the characters. Music director Lim Ha-young selected all the songs, with additional input from writer Shin Ha-eun, director Yoo Je-won, and the cast and crew. Similar to the character Hong Du-sik in the original film, Kim Seon-ho sang and played guitar in the drama. In the series, Du-sik covered "Old Love" from Lee Moon-sae, different song from the original film. Other characters also performed at the "Lighthouse Song Festival" in Gongjin Village. The festival's opening stage featured Gongjin's resident celebrity, Oh Yeon, performing his only hit song, "Exercising in the Moonlight." To create a realistic atmosphere, Jo Han-chul performed the song live while playing the guitar. Composed by Lim in the 1990s, the song was specifically chosen to achieve an authentic nineties sound and was a fitting choice for Oh Yeon's character, as it was ranked second in the 1993 K-pop Top 10 Gayo.

Songs performed by the series' characters
Episode	Title		Original singer	Performed by	Album	Note	Ref.
Episode	English	Korean	Original singer	Performed by	Album	Note	Ref.
4	Old Love	옛사랑	Lee Moon-sae	Hong Du-sik	—N/a	Cafe performance	
6	Exercise at the Moonlit Night	달밤에 체조	Oh Yoon	Oh Yoon (Oh Cheon-jae)	Hometown Cha-Cha-Cha OST Album	Performance at Lighthouse Song Festivals	
6	Don't Give Up	포기하지마	Sung Jin-woo	Choi Geum-cheol	—N/a	Performance at Lighthouse Song Festivals	
6	Tears	눈물	Soo Chan-hwee	Jo Nam-sook	—N/a	Performance at Lighthouse Song Festivals	
6	Let's live with a smile	웃으며 살자	Shin Shin-ae	Lee Mat-yi and Park Sook-ja	—N/a	Performance at Lighthouse Song Festivals	
6	My Starry Love	별빛 같은 나의 사랑아	Lim Young-woong	Kim Gam-ri	—N/a	Performance at Lighthouse Song Festivals	
6	I will hug you tight	꼭 안아줄래요	Jang Yu-na and Lee Eu-nu	Choi Bo-ra	—N/a	Performance at Lighthouse Song Festivals	
6	Just a Feeling		DOS	Oh Ju-ri	—N/a	Performance at Lighthouse Song Festivals	
6	Just a Feeling		DOS	DOS	Hometown Cha-Cha-Cha OST Album	Performance at Lighthouse Song Festivals	
14	Love is forgotten by love	사랑이 다른 사랑으로 잊혀지네	Hareem	Ji Seong-hyun	—N/a	Gongjin party to celebrate Ji Seong-hyun PD Variety Show	

=== Original soundtrack ===
The Hometown Cha-Cha-Cha soundtrack album, written by music director Lim Ha-young, comprises 11 songs (including singles) and 32 score pieces from the series. The album features vocal performances from artists such as Car, the Garden, Kassy, Cheeze, Choi Yu-ree, Kim Jae-hwan, Sandeul, Seungmin (Stray Kids), and Lee Sang-yi. In total, the compilation includes 43 tracks. In addition to the 8 previously released OST songs, the album includes "Just a Feeling" by the fictional idol group 'DOS' in the drama, which was highly requested by viewers. It also features two songs by "Oh Yoon," performed by actor Jo Han-chul as the superstar of 'Gongjin' in the drama, titled "Exercise at the Moonlit Night" and "End and Beginning." The album aims to fully capture the emotions of Hometown Cha-Cha-Cha and evoke the lingering feelings from the drama.

On July 18, 2022, Hometown Cha-Cha-Cha soundtrack album also released in LP version. It was ranked 9 in the Circle Chart Retail Album Chart on July 19, 2022, with 891 copies sold.

Hometown Cha-Cha-Cha

Soundtrack album by Various Artists
- Released: October 18, 2021
- Genre: Soundtrack
- Languages: Korean; English
- Label: Stone Music Entertainment

Disc 1
No.	Title	Artist	Length
1.	"Romantic Sunday" (로맨틱 선데이)	Car, the Garden	3:50
2.	"One Sunny Day" (어느 햇살 좋은 날)	Kassy	3:56
3.	"My Romance"	Cheeze	2:53
4.	"Wish" (바람)	Choi Yu-ree	3:57
5.	"Be the Light" (빛이 되어줘)	Kim Jae-hwan	3:54
6.	"The Image of You (Remains in My Memory)" (내 기억 속에 남아있는 그대 모습은)	Sandeul	3:09
7.	"Here Always"	Seungmin (Stray Kids)	4:14
8.	"I Hope You're Happy" (행복했으면 좋겠어)	Lee Sang-yi	3:17
9.	"Just a Feeling"	DOS	3:13
10.	"Exercise at the Moonlit Night" (달밤에 체조)	Oh Yoon	3:25
11.	"The Beginning of the End" (끝과 시작)	Oh Yoon	4:00
Total length:			39:48

Disc 2
No.	Title	Artist	Length
1.	"The Title of Hometown Cha-Cha-Cha" (갯마을 차차차 타이틀)	Yoo Jong-hyun	2:17
2.	"Start" (스타트)	Lim Ha-young	1:43
3.	"I Am Mr. Hong" (나는야 홍반장)	Shin Min-yong	1:59
4.	"This Is Not Right" (이건 아니잖아)	Yoo Jong-hyun	2:13
5.	"Star Above the Sea" (바다에 뜬 별)	Im Seung-bum	2:26
6.	"My Hometown" (내 고향 갯마을)	Yoo Jong-hyun	2:21
7.	"Dimple Couple" (보조개 커플)	Byun Dong-wook	1:52
8.	"Biggest Mistake" (역대급 실수)	Kim Ji-young	2:40
9.	"It Wasn't Meant to Be" (이게 아닌데)	Kim Wan-jung	1:44
10.	"When I Think of You" (그대가 생각날 때)	Byun Dong-wook	2:25
11.	"Charmer" (애교스트)	Shin Min-yong	2:00
12.	"Where People Live" (사람이 사는 곳)	Yoo Jong-hyun	2:08
13.	"Connection" (인연)	Jin Myeong-yong	3:29
14.	"You're Beside Me" (곁에 있는 너)	Kim Ji-young	3:21
15.	"Old Bicycle" (낡은 자전거)	Byun Dong-wook	1:53
16.	"Sunset of the City" (도시의 노을)	Lim Ji-won	1:16
17.	"The Waltz of Gongjin" (공진왈츠)	Jin Myeong-yong	2:49
18.	"Run!" (달려!)	Shin Min-yong	1:34
19.	"The Romance of Mi-sun and Eun-cheol" (미선과 은철의 멜로)	Byun Dong-wook	1:49
20.	"Woojjoojjoo" (우쭈쭈)	Yoo Jong-hyun	2:15
21.	"Different Direction Than Expected" (예상과 다른 방향)	Byun Dong-wook	1:40
22.	"Cheer Up, Ji PD!" (힘내! 지피디)	Kim Wan-jung	1:47
23.	"The Appearance of Cho-hee" (초희의 등장)	Byun Dong-wook	1:34
24.	"Running Away" (줄행랑)	Kim Ji-young	2:13
25.	"Pretty Woman" (프리티우먼)	Yoo Jong-hyun	1:32
26.	"Buried Wounds" (묻어둔 상처)	Kim Wan-jung	3:14
27.	"The Voice Inside of Me" (마음의 소리)	Shin Min-yong	2:12
28.	"The Romance of Hwa-jeong and Young-guk" (화정 영국의 로맨스)	Lim Ha-young	1:28
29.	"Tiny Wish" (소소한 바램)	Lim Ha-young	2:01
30.	"Plop" (퐁당)	Kim Ji-young	3:30
31.	"Family" (가족)	Lim Ha-young	1:38
32.	"Farewell, Grandma Gam-li" (안녕 감리씨)	Jin Myeong-yong	3:02
Total length:			75:04

Hometown Cha-Cha-Cha

Soundtrack album by Various Artists
- Released: July 18, 2022
- Genre: Soundtrack
- Languages: Korean; English
- Label: Stone Music Entertainment

LP (Side A)
No.	Title	Artist	Length
1.	"The Title of Hometown Cha-Cha-Cha" (갯마을 차차차 타이틀)	Yoo Jong-hyun	2:17
2.	"Romantic Sunday" (로맨틱 선데이)	Car, the Garden	3:50
3.	"One Sunny Day" (어느 햇살 좋은 날)	Kassy	3:56
4.	"My Romance"	Cheeze	2:53
5.	"Wish" (바람)	Choi Yu-ree	3:57
6.	"Be the Light" (빛이 되어줘)	Kim Jae-hwan	3:54
Total length:			20:47

LP (Side B)
No.	Title	Artist	Length
7.	"The Image of You (Remains in My Memory)" (내 기억 속에 남아있는 그대 모습은)	Sandeul	3:09
8.	"Here Always"	Seungmin (Stray Kids)	4:14
9.	"I Hope You're Happy" (행복했으면 좋겠어)	Lee Sang-yi	3:17
10.	"Just a Feeling"	DOS	3:13
11.	"Exercise at the Moonlit Night" (달밤에 체조)	Oh Yoon	3:25
12.	"The Beginning of the End" (끝과 시작)	Oh Yoon	4:00
Total length:			21:18

OST Part 1–8

=== Part 1 ===
Released on September 5, 2021
No.	Title	Lyrics	Music	Artist	Length
1.	"Romantic Sunday" (로맨틱 선데이)	Jung Myung-hoon (Ciel)	Lim Ha-young	Car, the Garden	3:50
2.	"Romantic Sunday" (Inst.)		Lim Ha-young		3:50
Total length:					7:40

=== Part 2 ===
Released on September 12, 2021
No.	Title	Lyrics	Music	Artist	Length
1.	"One Sunny Day" (어느 햇살 좋은 날)	TETE	TETE	Kassy	3:56
2.	"One Sunny Day" (Inst.)		TETE		3:56
Total length:					7:52

=== Part 3 ===
Released on September 19, 2021
No.	Title	Lyrics	Music	Artist	Length
1.	"My Romance"	Jade	Jade	Cheeze	2:53
2.	"My Romance" (Inst.)		Jade		2:53
Total length:					5:46

=== Part 4 ===
Released on September 25, 2021
No.	Title	Lyrics	Music	Artist	Length
1.	"Wish" (바람)	Choi Yu-ree	Choi Yu-ree	Choi Yu-ree	3:57
2.	"Wish" (Inst.)		Choi Yu-ree		3:57
Total length:					7:54

=== Part 5 ===
Released on September 26, 2021
No.	Title	Lyrics	Music	Artist	Length
1.	"Be the Light" (빛이 되어줘)	Jeong Gu-hyeon; Aseul	Jeong Gu-hyeon	Kim Jae-hwan	3:54
2.	"Be the Light" (Inst.)		Jeong Gu-hyeon		3:54
Total length:					7:58

=== Part 6 ===
Released on October 3, 2021
No.	Title	Lyrics	Music	Artist	Length
1.	"The Image of You (Remains in My Memory)" (내 기억 속에 남아있는 그대 모습은)	Kako	Kako; Nathan	Sandeul	3:09
2.	"The Image of You (Remains in My Memory)" (Inst.)		Kako; Nathan		3:09
Total length:					6:18

=== Part 7 ===
Released on October 10, 2021
No.	Title	Lyrics	Music	Artist	Length
1.	"Here Always"	Jeong Gu-hyeon; Aseul	Jeong Gu-hyeon	Seungmin (Stray Kids)	4:15
2.	"Here Always" (Inst.)		Jeong Gu-hyeon		4:15
Total length:					8:30

=== Part 8 ===
Released on October 17, 2021
No.	Title	Lyrics	Music	Artist	Length
1.	"I Hope You're Happy" (행복했으면 좋겠어)	Hen	Hen	Lee Sang-yi	3:18
2.	"I Hope You're Happy" (Inst.)		Hen		3:18
Total length:					6:36

==== Chart performance ====
Title	Year	Peak	Remarks
Title	Year	KOR	Remarks
"Romantic Sunday" (Car, the Garden)	2021	97	Part 1
"One Sunny Day" (Kassy)	2021	107	Part 2
"My Romance" (Cheeze)	2021	154	Part 3
"Wish" Choi Yu-ree	2021	97	Part 4
"Be the Light" (Kim Jae-hwan)	2021	91	Part 5
"The Image of You (Remains in My Memory)" (Sandeul)	2021	45	Part 6
"Here Always" (Seungmin (Stray Kids))	2021	125	Part 7
"I Hope You're Happy" (Lee Sang-yi)	2021	112	Part 8

== Merchandise ==
The series' original script was published in two volumes, each covering eight episodes, released officially on November 8, 2021. The scheduled publication of the Hometown Cha‑Cha‑Cha photo essay was canceled on November 30, 2021. On October 17, 2022, officials confirmed the photo essay would proceed, and it was eventually released in February 2023 as a two‑book package, each volume covering eight episodes.

Tied-in media
Year	Title		Author	Publisher	Published date	ISBN
Year	English	Korean	Author	Publisher	Published date	ISBN
2021	Hometown Cha-Cha-Cha Vol 1: Shin Ha-Eun Scriptbook	갯마을 차차차 1: 신하은 대본집 신하은	Shin Ha-eun	Booklog Company Co., Ltd	November 8, 2021	979-1-1680-3004-6
2021	Hometown Cha-Cha-Cha Vol 2: Shin Ha-Eun Scriptbook	갯마을 차차차 2: 신하은 대본집 신하은	Shin Ha-eun	Booklog Company Co., Ltd	November 8, 2021	979-1-1680-3005-3
2023	Hometown Cha-Cha-Cha Photo Essay	갯마을 차차차 포토에세이	Studio Dragon	Booklog Company Co., Ltd	February 14, 2023	979-1-1680-3043-5

== Viewership ==
=== Television broadcast ===
Hometown Cha-Cha-Cha : South Korea viewers per episode (millions)

Season	Episode number																Average
Season	1	2	3	4	5	6	7	8	9	10	11	12	13	14	15	16	Average
1	1.670	1.624	2.126	2.232	2.490	2.593	2.321	2.106	2.397	2.978	2.438	2.776	2.459	3.013	2.652	3.237	2.444

Source: Audience measurement performed nationwide by Nielsen Korea

Average TV viewership ratings
Ep.	Original broadcast date	Average audience share (Nielsen Korea)	
Ep.	Original broadcast date	Nationwide	Seoul
1	August 28, 2021	6.821% (1st)	6.821% (1st)
2	August 29, 2021	6.666% (1st)	6.687% (1st)
3	September 4, 2021	8.733% (1st)	9.002% (1st)
4	September 5, 2021	8.742% (1st)	9.319% (1st)
5	September 11, 2021	9.996% (1st)	10.940% (1st)
6	September 12, 2021	10.270% (1st)	11.038% (1st)
7	September 18, 2021	9.102% (1st)	9.328% (1st)
8	September 19, 2021	8.145% (1st)	8.472% (1st)
9	September 25, 2021	9.067% (1st)	9.948% (1st)
10	September 26, 2021	11.397% (1st)	12.432% (1st)
11	October 2, 2021	9.299% (1st)	9.935% (1st)
12	October 3, 2021	10.723% (1st)	11.649% (1st)
13	October 9, 2021	9.171% (1st)	9.396% (1st)
14	October 10, 2021	11.643% (1st)	12.477% (1st)
15	October 16, 2021	10.347% (1st)	10.535% (1st)
16	October 17, 2021	12.665% (1st)	13.322% (1st)
Average		9.549%	10.081%
In the table above, the blue numbers represent the lowest ratings and the red numbers represent the highest ratings.; This series aired on a cable channel/pay TV which normally has a relatively smaller audience compared to free-to-air TV/public broadcasters (KBS, SBS, MBC and EBS).

The series achieved peak nationwide ratings of 12.665 percent, making it into the list of highest-rated series on Korean cable television.

=== Streaming ===
Following its release on Netflix, Hometown Cha-Cha-Cha became one of the platform's most-watched non-English television shows. According to FlixPatrol, a website providing global rankings for shows on Netflix, the series placed number 8 on its global chart. It remained on Netflix's most-watched non-English popular television show list for 16 weeks in global top ten rankings, and reached the top 10 charts in more than 20 countries. It also remained on Netflix's Top 10 Chart for television shows for more than two months from its last episode.

Netflix Global Top 10 Non-English Shows
Netflix Global Top 10 Non-English Shows
Week	Date	Rank	Hours	Ref.
1	August 30 – September 5, 2021	7	9,630,000	
2	September 6–12, 2021	5	14,870,000	
3	September 13–19, 2021	4	18,580,000	
4	September 20–26, 2021	2	23,360,000	
5	September 27 – October 3, 2021	3	28,330,000	
6	October 4–10, 2021	3	32,890,000	
7	October 11–17, 2021	4	37,740,000	
8	October 18–24, 2021	5	31,840,000	
9	October 25–31, 2021	5	18,290,000	
10	November 1 – October 7, 2021	3	16,010,000	
11	November 8 – October 14, 2021	3	13,820,000	
12	November 15 – October 21, 2021	6	13,150,000	
13	November 22–28, 2021	6	13,310,000	
14	November 29 – December 5, 2021	10	11,560,000	
15	December 6–12, 2021	8	9,680,000	
16	December 13–19, 2021	10	7,520,000	
Total hours			300,580,000	

== Reception ==
=== Industry metrics ===
During its run, Hometown Cha-Cha-Cha had good record in several industry metrics. In the Content Power Index (CPI), (Note: CPI Index is an index that identifies the behavior of viewers for 29 channels including terrestrial, general programming, and cable TV dramas, entertainment, music, and infotainment programs during prime time. Through the Broadcasting Contents Value Information Analysis System (RACOI) of the Korea Communications Commission, program-related viewer data (number of video views, posts, and comments) is collected on a weekly basis and converted into standard scores based on 200 points to calculate the average.) powered by RACOI, the drama entered the Top 10, ranking 6th in the 4th week of August (August 23–29). It continued to perform strongly, reaching 3rd place in the drama category and 4th overall in the first and second weeks of September. By the third week of September, it climbed to 2nd in drama and 3rd overall. For four consecutive weeks, from the 4th week of September to the 2nd week of October 2021, Hometown Cha-Cha-Cha secured the 1st ranking the drama category. In the overall category, it placed 2nd in the 4th and 5th weeks of September, dipped slightly to 4th in the 1st week of October, and then returned to 2nd in the 2nd week of October.

The Korea Corporate Reputation Research Institute, in September 2021, reported that Kim topped the drama actor brand reputation ranking, while Shin secured the third position. Their analysis considered factors such as brand participation, media volume, traffic volume, and communication volume, measuring and indexing them with a brand reputation algorithm. Compared to the drama actor brand data in August 2021, their brand reputation collectively increased by 21 percent. In a year-end poll conducted by Gallup in South Korea, Kim was named Gallup Korea's Television Actor of the Year, with Shin ranked second.

The series consistently charted in the Good Data Corporation's Top 10 TV Drama Buzz-worthiness List from the 3rd week of August to the 2nd week of October 2021. It debuted at 8th in the third week of August, rose to 3rd in the fourth week of August and the first two weeks of September, and climbed to 2nd place in the third week of September before securing the top spot in the fourth week of September and the first week of October. The main leads consistently ranked high during this period; Kim Seon-ho took 1st place and Shin Min-a ranked 2nd for consecutive weeks from the 3rd week of August to the 4th week of September. In the 5th week of September, Kim ranked 2nd and Shin 3rd. In the 1st and 2nd weeks of October 2021, Kim regained the top spot, while Shin ranked 5th in the 1st week and returned to 3rd place in the 2nd week.

In 2022, Good Data Corporation released Top 20 FUNdex. (Note: FUNdex is abbreviation from fun index, the online public opinion analysis published by agency Makenew (메이크뉴), research project of Good Data Corporation. It calculates the score of drama fun for the first time in Korea. The study included 355 dramas broadcast on terrestrial, general and cable channels from 2018 to 2021, but daily dramas and short dramas were excluded from the survey.) The series ranked 17th with a score of 83.13 out of 355 Korean dramas aired from 2018 to 2021. FUNdex utilized data from Good Data Corporation and public data from RACOI. It assessed content's fun factor and box office potential by integrating six data points: household viewers, 20-49 age group viewers, buzz-worthiness, performer's buzz-worthiness, clip views, and media attention.

On April 18, 2022, the results of The 2021 Big Data Utilization Hallyu Market Research were announced. This report, published by the Ministry of Culture, Sports and Tourism and The Korean Foundation for International Cultural Exchange (KOFICE), focused on public interest in the Korean Wave. It analyzed the current status of the Korean Wave by collecting and analyzing real-time global online reactions. Among the most searched and prominent keywords related to K-drama in the report were Hometown Cha-Cha-Cha, as well as "Kim Seon-ho" and "Shin Min-a".

=== Critical reception ===
Professional ratings
Review scores
Source	Rating
South China Morning Post	3/5 stars
The Straits Times	4/5 stars
Yahoo Singapore	3.5/5 stars

Pierce Conran of the South China Morning Post gave the series a generally positive review, noting that the show "kept things simple." He added that while it occasionally indulged in "hokey dramatics," it never risked alienating its dedicated audience. Jan Lee of The Straits Times praised its "idyllic setting, charming leads, and colorful supporting characters." S. Poorvaja of The Hindu noted it as a worthy representation of "slice-of-life goodness and wholesome romance of the best kind." Lim Yian Lu from Yahoo Singapore highlighted its "therapeutic picture, as well as its "cute and amusing moments."

Other critics offered mixed assessments. Joel Keller of Decider highlighted the "seashore scenery and the chemistry between the show's leads," but criticized the slow pacing. Similarly, Bang Yeon-joo of PD Journal critiqued the reliance on traditional gender stereotypes, specifically citing the recurring "damsel in distress" trope where Du-sik would repeatedly rescue Hye-jin. However, Bang also acknowledged the show's commercial success, attributed to its ability to create a calming and enjoyable atmosphere by developing not just the central romance, but also the heartfelt stories of the town's charming residents.

Writing for Entermedia, Pop culture critic Jung Deok-hyeon described the show's reliance on clichés as a weakness, identifying a scene with a house trespasser as contrived and an outdated plot device to bring the leads closer. Despite these criticisms, writing in PD Journal, Jung described the series as a "Soft Healing Drama," attributing its positive reception to the compelling fantasy of Gongjin Village, which provided a stark contrast to intense dramas like Squid Game. This sentiment was echoed by Professor Mo Jong-rin of Yonsei University, who called the series "refreshing." Mo suggested that the community in Hometown Cha-Cha-Cha serves as a positive alternative to the harsh realities depicted in Squid Game, he added, "I apologize to fans of Squid Game, but I honestly hope that foreigners remember Korea not as a sharp-edged country that provocatively criticizes reality, but as a warm country that presents a community-based alternative to societal issues."

Hometown Cha-Cha-Cha is included in various critics' top drama lists. Variety ranked the series sixth on its list of "The Best International TV Shows of 2021," noting its lighthearted nature and simplicity offered a "refreshing escape amidst the pandemic's gloom." NME placed the series eighth on its list of "The Best Kdrama of 2021," praising its straightforward approach to dilemmas and its comforting, "warm embrace" feel. The series was also included in a list of "Best K-drama TV shows on Netflix" by The Scotsman. Chad de Guzman from Time included the drama in his list of "The 8 best Korean dramas on Netflix," remarking, "'Best' doesn't always have to mean 'intense and thought-provoking'. Sometimes it can simply mean easy, enjoyable viewing."

== Impact ==
=== Commercial ===
South Korean's media outlets dubbed the enthusiastic responses to the drama as Gaetcha yeolpung (갯차 열풍; 'Hometown Cha-Cha-Cha Craze'). One of its impact the craze was a surge in demand for products featured in the series as product placement. Following a scene where Hye-jin gave Du-sik a bottle of wine in the fifth episode, inquiries about the brand reportedly soared. The importer said the wine temporarily sold out in September. Interest in Hye-jin's fashion, including her clothing, jewelry, and shoes, also experienced a notable rise. Her style was praised for its charming combination of sophistication and unique charm. By November, reports said around 3,000 units of Couronne's Mila Lady Bag, which Hye-jin carried in the drama, had sold out.

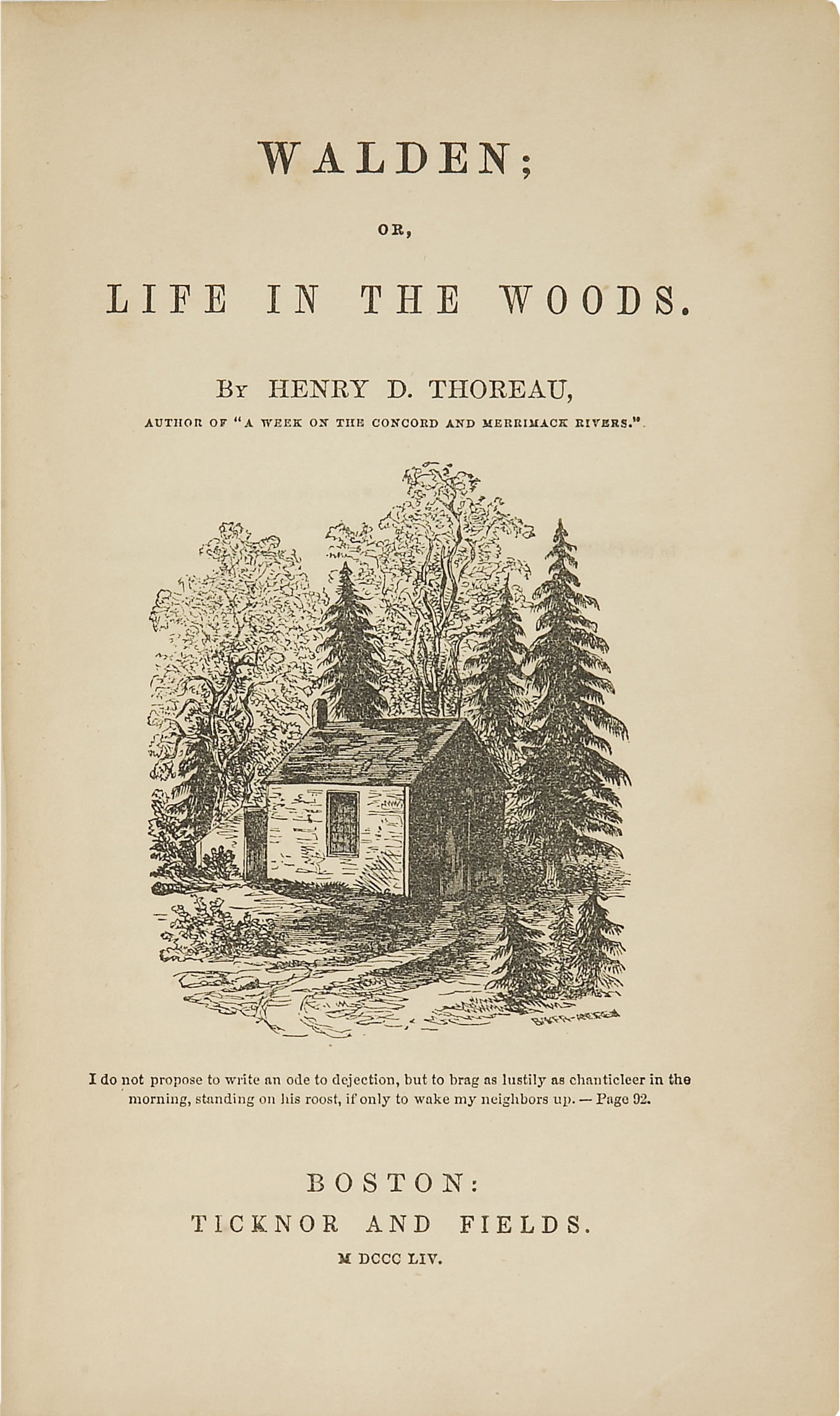
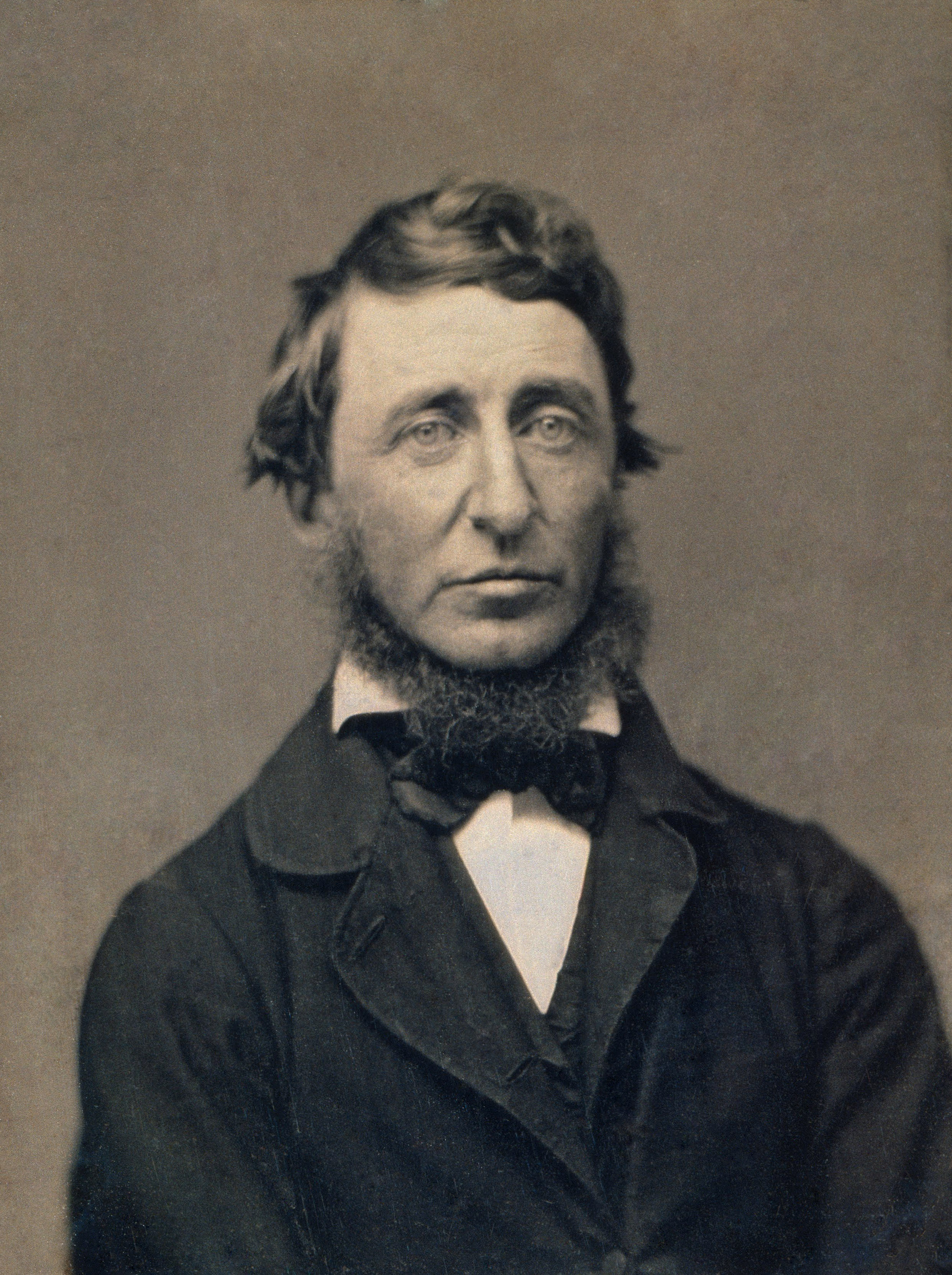
Walden Book (left) and Henry David Thoreau (right)

Two books featured in the series experienced a surge in sales. After Hong Du-sik recited Kim Haeng-sook's poem "The Gate Keeper," the 2014 poetry collection Portrait of Echo became a bestseller seven years after its release. By the second week of October 2021, the book reached second and third place on the poetry charts of Kyobo Bookstore and Yes24, respectively. The Korean translation of Henry David Thoreau's Walden, shown being read by Du-sik in episode 2 and quoted in a promotional clip, rose to 11th on the Yes24 essay bestseller list. Yes24 reported sales increases of 3,257 percent for Portrait of Echo and 369 percent for Walden following their inclusion in the series.

The limited first editions of the unedited script books which included autographs and messages from writer Shin Ha-eun and actors Shin Min-a and Kim Seon-ho, topped bestseller list soon after its release. According to Yes24, over 9,000 copies were pre-ordered on the publication day alone, with buyers primarily being women in their 20s and 30s. The scriptbooks also reached number one on Aladin's bestseller list on October 16, 2021, with an official from the company noting that it is rare for a drama script to achieve such a high ranking.

The series also contributed to strong financial results for its production companies. It was reported that in third quarter of 2021, Studio Dragon had a 27.7% increase in sales to ₩64.9 billion. Sales proportion also rose to 55.9%, a 8.1% increase from the previous year. GTist achieved a full profit in 2021 with a net profit of ₩2.1 billion. CJ ENM, the parent company of GTist, Studio Dragon, and tvN, recorded consolidated sales of ₩857.5 billion and an operating profit of ₩87.8 billion in third quarter of 2021. It also saw a 7.4% rise in sales and a 23.6% increase in operating profit in the same period, with the growth attributed to successful dramas including Hometown Cha-Cha-Cha.

=== Tourism ===
The drama Hometown Cha-Cha-Cha triggered set-jetting tourism in Pohang. Filming locations became a frequent addition to travel itineraries, reportedly revitalizing the local commercial district and economy. One notable example is Sabang Memorial Park in Heunghae-eup, Buk District, Pohang, which features Hong Du-sik's boat on the mountain Mugeunbong. According to Choi Young-moo of the Pohang City Tourism Marketing Team, daily visitors to the park increased from 500 on holidays to between 3,000 and 4,000 after the series aired.

Cheongha Market underwent a similar transition. Originally a quiet hub of 25 shops operating on a five-day cycle, it was rebranded as "Cheongha Gongjin Market" after the fictional village's name in the series. The market now features several permanent sets, including the Squid Statue, Bora Supermarket, and the "Coffee by Day, Beer by Night" café. The Seokbyeong-ri lighthouse and its coastal embankment, where Hye-jin confessed her feelings to Du-sik, have become popular photo spots for couples. Nearby, the Cheongjin-ri Village features the former Yoon Dental Clinic set, operates as a restaurant called Yoon's Clinic that preserves the drama's original decor.

This emerging tourism sites were further integrated into national tourism campaigns by the Korea Tourism Organization. Following the broadcast of Hometown Cha-Cha-Cha, they partnered with Studio Dragon and LG U+ to create virtual reality content showcasing the drama's locations, made available on the LG U+ XR platform, U+DIVe, in November 24, 2021. In the same month, they also showcased the drama's filming locations on their Visit Korea website, as part of a K-Drama tour destination. In February 2023, Cheongha Gongjin Market was included in a 2023 "Hallyu Pilgrimage" promotion, highlighting 53 locations across South Korea. In 2026, the series was selected to be featured as one of top 40 Studio Dragon's intellectual properties in "K-Drama Exhibition: Scenes to Destinations" at HiKR Ground in Seoul.

The government of Pohang has invested ₩1.3 billion between 2023 and 2025 to upgrade infrastructure at these landmarks. Improvements included new parking facilities, an international visitor lounge featuring the drama-themed mural, and a renovation of the Squid Statue, which was formally inaugurated on February 27, 2025, by the mayor of Pohang. Under the slogan "Pohang, a City Like a Drama," the city aims to reach 10 million annual visitors by leveraging former filming sites of Korean contents. Throughout 2026, officials ramped up tourism promotions, hosting local briefings for Chinese influencers in July, followed in September by a two-day tour for Vietnamese travel agency representatives and visits from Mongolian influencers.

The series also contributed to tourism in Yangju, where the Chang Ucchin Museum of Art was featured in episode 12 as one of the dating spots of Du-sik and Hye-jin. Following this episode, officials noted a rise in inquiries about the museum, attracting viewers drawn to its unique architecture and natural surroundings.

=== Return to the countryside ===
The series has inspired a model of modern countryside ideals. While large-scale farming provides a full-time income, it requires demanding, year-round labor. Alternatively, small-scale farming requires young people to juggle multiple side jobs to survive. As small villages lack the population to support specialized businesses, they need residents like Hong Banjang, who blend small-scale farming with everyday services like home repairs and neighborhood assistance and thus keeping rural communities alive. Newcomers to fishing communities are more likely to be accepted when they follow the example set by Hong Banjang and participate actively in village events while taking part in shared responsibilities. A major practical barrier is securing baejari (배자리; 'A place where ships dock to load and unload cargo within a port'). These spots are often controlled by established community rights, making them difficult for outsiders to obtain.

As interest in rural relocation has grown, gwieohakgyo (귀어학교; 'fishery return schools') have experienced a noticeable surge in demand, with competition rates at some institutions reaching 11 to 1. Many aspiring fishermen are in their twenties and thirties from diverse professional backgrounds, including programmers, bankers, and chefs, who seek a fresh start after experiencing corporate burnout or job loss. To cater to this demand, the Ministry of Oceans and Fisheries of South Korea relaunched its portal in December 2021 as the "Return to the Seaside Village Comprehensive Information Platform." The site consolidates resources from support centers and gwieohakgyo (귀어학교), providing centralized data on support programs and infrastructure to assist prospective rural residents.

The series was cited in opening lecture in the '2026 Goyang Special City Village Community Festa' in Goyang. Kim Cheol-gi, Secretary General of the Goyang Citizens' Association, delivered the first "opening lecture" on the topic of "Village Communities as Seen Through Dramas." In his lecture, Kim analyzed the interactions among village members in mass media, stating, "A village community model where neighbors help each other is only completed when a 'culture of acknowledging differences' among village members takes precedence," citing an accepting attitude toward diversity as the foundation for mutual prosperity.

== Accolades ==
=== Awards and nominations ===
Name of the award ceremony, year presented, category, nominee of the award, and the result of the nomination
Award ceremony	Year	Category	Nominee	Result	Ref.
Asian Academy Creative Awards	2022	National Winner (Korea) – Best Direction (Fiction)	Yoo Je-won	Won	
APAN Star Awards	2022	Top Excellence Award, Actress in a Miniseries	Shin Min-a	Won	
APAN Star Awards	2022	Popularity Star Award, Actress	Shin Min-a	Nominated	
Asia Television Award	2022	Best Drama Series	Hometown Cha-Cha-Cha	Nominated	
Kim Soo-hyun Drama Art Hall (Cheongju Cultural Industry Promotion Foundation)	2021	Serial Drama Category – Good Drama of the Year (Note: The drama's network tvN, director Yoo Je-won, writer Shin Ha-eun and main actors (Shin Min-a, Kim Seon-ho, Lee Sang-yi, Gong Min-jeung and Kim Young-ok) were also recognized in the award certificate.)	Hometown Cha-Cha-Cha	Won	
Korea Communications Commission Broadcasting Awards	2022	Hallyu Excellence Award	Hometown Cha-Cha-Cha	Won	
14th Korean Content Awards (Note: Honors are given at the Korean Content Awards (대한민국 콘텐츠 대상) arranged by the Korea Creative Content Agency and hosted by the Ministry of Culture, Sports and Tourism. The 2022 Korea Content Awards Ceremony, which started in 2009 and celebrated its 14th this year, aims to inspire pride in the content industry and develop the Korean cultural content industry by discovering and awarding contributors and excellent content that have contributed to the development of the content industry in 2022. It is a place to promote. The winners (works) of honor, which are recommended through the website of the Korea Creative Content Agency (www.kocca.kr) and announced through careful examination by experts and three-step verification, play a leading role in shining the Korean content industry in the world.)	2022	Minister of Culture, Sports and Tourism Commendation	Shin Ha-eun	Won	
Mnet Asian Music Awards	2021	Best OST	Choi Yu-ree — "Wish"	Nominated	
Seoul International Drama Awards	2022	Outstanding Korean Actor	Kim Seon-ho	Won	

=== Listicles ===
Name of publisher, year listed, name of listicle, and placement
Publisher	Year	Listicle	Placement	Ref.
Collider	2024	The Best Romantic Shows on Netflix Right Now	Top 20	
Entertainment Weekly	2026	The 21 best Korean shows on Netflix to watch now	Top 21	
GQ India	2023	10 best Korean Dramas on Netflix to start with if you're a first-time viewer	1st	
Joy News24 (Note: Joy News 24, an entertainment economic magazine, conducted a survey from October 12 to 19, 2021, about dramas, movies, actors, singers, and entertainment programs that shone in 2021 in celebration of its 17th anniversary. About 200 people in the industry participated in the survey, including executives at entertainment companies and broadcasting companies, producers of film and broadcast content, and reporters from the entertainment department. The results of the survey are presented by category.)	2021	2021 Best Drama	2nd	
KOFICE (Note: Korean Foundation for International Cultural Exchange (KOFICE) is a subsidiary agency under the Ministry of Culture, Sports and Tourism, which was established in 2003. The agency is aiming to promote Korean culture globally and connect the country to the world through cultural exchanges.)	2022	2022 Global Hallyu Trend (Korean drama category)	5th (Note: Shared position with Descendants of the Sun)	
NME	2021	The 10 best Korean dramas of 2021	8th	
Parade	2026	These 54 K-Dramas Are Worth Losing Sleep Over	Top 54	
Time	2023	The 8 Best Korean Dramas on Netflix Right Now	Top 8	
Variety	2021	The Best International TV Shows of 2021	6th	

== See also ==
- Mr. Handy, Mr. Hong
