= Here Always =

2021 song recorded by Seungmin

Single by Seungmin

from the album Hometown Cha-Cha-Cha OST
- Language: Korean; English
- Released: October 10, 2021
- Studio: Doobdoob (Seoul); Studio 1047 (Seoul)
- Genre: Lo-fi pop; acoustic; R&B
- Length: 4:14
- Label: Stone
- Composer: NieN
- Lyricists: NieN; Aseul
- Producer: NieN

Seungmin singles chronology
"Here Always" (2021)	"Close to You" (2022)

Hometown Cha-Cha-Cha singles chronology
"The Image of You (Remains in My Memory)" (2021)	"Here Always" (2021)	"I Hope You're Happy" (2021)

Music video
- "Here Always" on YouTube

"Here Always" is a song recorded by Seungmin, (Note: Credited as Stray Kids in some streaming platforms.) a member of Stray Kids, serving as the seventh original soundtrack of the 2021 South Korean television series, Hometown Cha-Cha-Cha. It was released digitally on October 10, 2021, through Stone Music Entertainment, as Seungmin's first solo song.

== Background and release ==
"Here Always" was featured for the first time in episodes 10 and 11 of Hometown Cha-Cha-Cha, aired on September 26 and October 2, 2021, respectively, where Yoon Hye-jin (Shin Min-a) confesses her heart to Hong Du-sik (Kim Seon-ho) and they kiss each other. Later, the song was confirmed to release on October 10 to digital music and streaming platforms, alongside the accompanying music video, featuring scenes from the series and shots of Seungmin performing the song in a recording studio.

== Composition ==
Written by NieN (Jeong Gu-hyun), and Aseul, "Here Always" is described as a slow-tempo acoustic lo-fi pop ballad song driven by "tender" piano with "rough" yet "emotionally-stimulating unique" voice that crosses between pop and R&B genres. It was composed in the key of D major, 82 beats per minute, with a running time of four minutes and fourteen seconds.

== Commercial performance ==
Upon its release, "Here Always" entered South Korea's Gaon Digital Chart at number 125 for the chart issue dated October 10–17, 2021. On its component charts, the song landed at number 13 on the Download Chart, number 182 on the Streaming Chart, and number 8 on the BGM Chart. "Here Always" also peaked at number 8 on both Hungarian Single Top 40, and Billboard World Digital Song Sales.

== Track listing ==
- Digital download / streaming
1. "Here Always" – 4:14
2. "Here Always" (instrumental) – 4:14

== Credits and personnel ==
Credits adapted from YouTube and the album liner notes.

Locations

- Studio 1074 – digital editing, recording
- Doobdoob Studio – recording
- Kokosound Studio – mixing
- SoundMax – mastering

Personnel

- Seungmin – vocals
- NieN (Jeong Gu-hyeon) – lyrics, composition, arrangement, piano, guitar, bass, chorus, digital editing, recording
- Aseul – lyrics
- Kwon Yu-jin – recording
- Go Hyun-jeong – mixing
- Park Joon – mastering
- Do Jeong-hee – mastering

== Charts ==
Chart performance for "Here Always"
Chart (2021)	Peak position
Hungary (Single Top 40)	8
South Korea (Circle)	125
US World Digital Song Sales (Billboard)	8

== Release history ==
Release dates and formats for "Here Always"
Region	Date	Format	Label	Ref.
Various	October 10, 2021	Digital download; streaming	Stone	
