= The Potato Lab =

2025 South Korean television series

- Promotional poster
- Hangul: 감자연구소
- Lit.: Potato Research Institute
- RR: Gamja yeonguso
- MR: Kamja yŏn'guso
- Genre: Romantic comedy
- Written by: Kim Ho-soo
- Directed by: Kang Il-soo
- Starring: Lee Sun-bin; Kang Tae-oh
- Music by: Park Se-joon (CP)
- Country of origin: South Korea
- Original language: Korean
- No. of episodes: 12

Production
- Running time: 70 minutes
- Production company: Chorokbaem Media

Original release
- Network: tvN
- Release: March 1 – April 6, 2025

The Potato Lab (Korean: 감자연구소) is a South Korean television series written by Kim Ho-soo, directed by Kang Il-soo, and starring Lee Sun-bin and Kang Tae-oh. The series is about a woman obsessed with potatoes swept away by a principled man like a tornado potato. It aired on tvN every Saturday and Sunday at 21:20 (KST) from March 1 to April 6, 2025. It is also available for streaming on Netflix in selected regions.

== Synopsis ==
A passionate researcher's life takes a turn when a strict director arrives at her potato lab — proving that love can sprout in the most unusual places.

Set in a mountain valley at a potato research center, the story is about a woman named Kim Mi-kyung, a potato-crazy researcher who is starting a fresh life again, and So Baek-ho, who energizes her fighting spirit.

== Cast ==
=== Main ===
- Lee Sun-bin as Kim Mi-kyung

A potato-crazy researcher. She is quite annoying, unorthodox, and fiery, which interests So Baek-ho. However, she is very passionate about her work and cares a lot about her friends, even if she doesn't show it.

- Kang Tae-oh as So Baek-ho

Wonhan Retail's organizational innovation director is efficient and composed—a no-nonsense man who strictly follows his principles. His rigid discipline and sharp focus make him an intimidating figure, known for getting things done with impressive speed and precision. However, because of these traits, he seems a bit awkward at times as he isn't sure how to deal with unusual things, like Mi-kyung's unpredictable behavior.

=== Supporting ===
- Lee Hak-joo as Park Ki-se

Mi-kyung's ex-boyfriend. He serves as executive director of Wonhan Retail's strategic planning division.

- Jung Shin-hye as Yoon Hee-jin

Park Ki-se's ex-wife.

- Kim Ga-eun as Lee Ong-ju

Mi-kyung's best friend. She is a web novel writer. She loves to ship Mi-kyung and Baek-ho constantly and tease her about it. She's subtly possessive over Kim Hwan-gyeong, getting angry when other girls interact or flirt with him. Despite this, she won't admit that she's interested in him, displaying a "tsundere" personality.

- Shin Hyun-seung as Kim Hwan-gyeong

Mi-kyung's younger brother. He confessed to Lee Ong-ju several times in the past, but got rejected. However, his feelings still linger.

- Yoo Seung-mok

- Kwak Ja-hyung as Go Jeong-hae

The self-proclaimed hipster manager.

- Woo Jung-won as Joo Seung-hee

A deputy manager. She has made the biggest contribution to the Potato Research Institute's teamwork.

- Kim Ji-ah as Jang Seul-gi

- Yoon Jeong-seop as Lee Chung-hyun

- Nam Hyun-woo as Kwon Hee-dong

An enthusiastic new hire at the Potato Research Institute.

== Production ==
=== Development ===
The Potato Lab is a romantic comedy series directed by Kang Il-soo and written by Kim Ho-soo. It was planned by CJENM Studios and produced by Chorokbaem Media.

=== Casting ===
On March 18, 2024, it was reported that Kang Tae-oh, who was about to be discharged from his military service, was considering to star in the series. The next day, media reported that Lee Sun-bin would play the female lead, and that Kang had confirmed his appearance. On May 14, tvN officially confirmed the two actors' casting.

== Release ==
The Potato Lab premiered on tvN on March 1, 2025, and aired every Saturday and Sunday at 21:20 (KST). It was also made available for streaming on Netflix in selected regions.

== Viewership ==
The Potato Lab : South Korea viewers per episode (thousands)

Season	Episode number												Average
Season	1	2	3	4	5	6	7	8	9	10	11	12	Average
1	473	414	369	506	280	409	294	441	282	449	328	420	389

Source: Audience measurement performed nationwide by Nielsen Korea.

Average TV viewership ratings
Ep.	Original broadcast date	Average audience share (Nielsen Korea)	
Ep.	Original broadcast date	Nationwide	Seoul
1	March 1, 2025	1.705% (5th)	1.744% (3rd)
2	March 2, 2025	1.811% (3rd)	1.906% (2nd)
3	March 8, 2025	1.4% (13th)	1.551% (6th)
4	March 9, 2025	2.003% (3rd)	1.883% (2nd)
5	March 15, 2025	1.1% (16th)	1.133% (5th)
6	March 16, 2025	1.632% (5th)	1.639% (2nd)
7	March 22, 2025	1.298% (8th)	1.376% (4th)
8	March 23, 2025	2.000% (2nd)	1.570% (4th)
9	March 29, 2025	1.1% (18th)	1.447% (6th)
10	March 30, 2025	1.920% (3rd)	1.712% (3rd)
11	April 5, 2025	1.2% (11th)	1.272% (9th)
12	April 6, 2025	1.791% (3rd)	1.714% (2nd)
Average		1.58%	1.58%
In the table above, the blue numbers represent the lowest ratings and the red numbers represent the highest ratings.; This drama airs on a cable channel/pay TV which normally has a relatively smaller audience compared to free-to-air TV/public broadcasters (KBS, SBS, MBC, and EBS).
