= 26th Bucheon International Fantastic Film Festival =

Film festival in Bucheon South Korea

- Official poster
- Opening film: Men by Alex Garland
- Closing film: New Normal by Jeong Beom-sik
- Location: Bucheon, South Korea
- Awards: Bucheon Choice (Best of Bucheon): You Won't Be Alone by Goran Stolevski; Series Film Award: Squid Game
- Hosted by: BIFAN Organizing Committee
- No. of films: 268 films from 49 countries (118 features, 104 shorts, 42 XR)
- Festival date: Opening: July 7, 2022; Closing: July 17, 2022
- Website: BIFAN 2022 Fact Sheet

Bucheon International Fantastic Film Festival
- 27th 25th

The 26th Bucheon International Fantastic Film Festival (Korean: 제26회 부천국제판타스틱영화제), an international film festival held in Bucheon, South Korea, began on 7 July 2022 with the slogan 'Stay Strange'. A non-competitive international film festival with a competitive section, opened with film Men by Alex Garland. This year the festival resumed its offline events after two years, which were curtailed due to COVID-19.

The opening ceremony was hosted by Park Byung-eun and Han Sun-hwa, with the red carpet event held during the festival after 2 years. In addition face-to-face interaction between directors, actors, producers, and other people in the film industry and the audience also took place. The festival featured 268 films from 49 countries, and closed with New Normal, a Korean film by Jeong Beom-sik on July 17. 92,353 people participated in the festival in 11 days.

You Won't Be Alone by Goran Stolevski won 'Best of Bucheon award', whereas Christian Tafdrup of Denmark won 'Best Director Choice' for his film Speak No Evil.

== Events ==
- Performances
  - Strange Stage (Music Presented by ‘Essential Management for Artists’)
- Program Events
  - Master Class with Brian Yuzna
  - Master Class with Alexandre O. Philippe
  - Master Class with Masato Harada
- Forum
- Exhibition
- Experiences

=== Halloween in July: Stay Strange ===
July 8 — July 9
Bucheon City Hall Lawn Square, Sohyang-ro, Bucheon Jungang Park, Ahn Jung-geun Park, BIFAN Street, Koryo Hotel

=== Special exhibition ===
The festival will resume the event after 3 years and host an actor special exhibition 'The Actor, Sol Kyung-gu' focusing on actor Sol Kyung-gu's 29-year acting career along with various events such as the publication of a commemorative booklet entitled 'Sul Kyung-gu is Snow Gyeong-gu', and mega talk during the festival.

== Jury ==
=== Bucheon Choice: Features ===
- Masato Harada (Japanese film director, film critic, and sometimes an actor)
- Nick James (British film critic and former editor of the Sight & Sound magazine)
- Kang Hye-jung (CEO and founder of Filmmakers R&K since 2005.)
- Shim Hye-jin (South Korean actress and model)
- Monica Garcia (General Manager of the Foundation Sitges - International Fantastic Film Festival of Catalonia)

=== Korean Fantastic: Features ===
- Lee Don-ku (South Korean film director, screenwriter and actor)
- Yoo Bo-ra (South Korean drama writer with a master’s degree from Dongguk University’s Graduate School of Digital Image and Contents)
- Lisa Dreyer (Festival Director for Fantastic Fest, the largest genre festival in the U.S.)

=== Bucheon Choice: Shorts and Korean Fantastic: Shorts ===
- Kim Kyung-Mook (South Korean filmmaker)
- Simojukka Ruippo (film director)
- Kim Ji-na (film producer)

=== MIFF Award for Best Asian Film ===
- Anders E Lasrsson (Critic, writer, editor, and festival director of Lund Fantastic Film Festival)
- Rocio Moreno (Spain, Program Coordinator at Fancine – Fantastic Film Festival of Málaga)

=== NETPAC Award ===
- Ida Anita Del Mundo (Writer, filmmaker, and musician)
- Lee Jin-na (Programmer at Ulju Mountain Film Festival (UMFF))
- Kwak Myung-dong (Film reporter for Metro, Focus, and My Daily for 20 years from 2002)

== Program ==
=== Opening film ===
English title	Original title	Director(s)	Production country
Men		Alex Garland	United Kingdom, United States

=== Closing film ===
English title	Original title	Director(s)	Production country
New Normal	소름	Jeong Beom-sik	South Korea

=== Bucheon Choice ===
==== Bucheon Choice Features ====
Highlighted title and ‡ indicates award winner

- Alien Artist (HOYA Seiyo, Japan 2021)
- Huesera: The Bone Woman Michelle Garza Cervera, Mexico, Peru 2022)
- La Pietà (Eduardo Casanova, Spain, 2022)
- Sissy (Hannah BARLOW, Kane SENES Australia, 2022)
- SLR (Lertsiri BOONMEE, Vutichai WONGNOPHADOL, Thailand, 2022)
- Social Distancing (Gilitte LEUNG, Hong Kong, China, 2022)
- ‡ Speak No Evil (Christian Tafdrup, Denmark, The Netherlands, 2022)
- Vesper (Kristina Buožytė, Bruno SAMPER, Lithuania, France, Belgium 2022)
- The Womb (Fajar NUGROS, Indonesia 2021)
- ‡ You Won't Be Alone (Goran Stolevski, Australia 2021)

==== Bucheon Choice Shorts ====
- Bird Woman (OOHARA Tokio, Japan 2022)
- Brutalia, Days of Labour (Manolis MAVRIS, Greece, Belgium 2021)
- Hideous (Yann GONZALEZ, UK 2021)
- Perfect City: The Mother (ZHOU Shengwei USA, China 2022)
- While Mortals Sleep (Alex FOFONOFF, USA 2021)
- Lucienne in a World Without Solitude (Geordy COUTURIAU, France 2021)
- Moshari (Nuhash HUMAYUN, Bangladesh 2021)
- Phlegm (Jan-David BOLT, Switzerland 2021)
- Such Small Hands (Maria MARTINEZ BAYONA, UK 2021)
- Warsha (Dania BDEIR, France, Lebanon 2021)

=== Korean Fantastic ===
==== Korean Fantastic: Features ====
Highlighted title and ‡ indicates award winner

- ‡ Body Parts (CHOE Wonkyung, JEON Byeong Deok, LEE Gwang Jin, G’sam, KIM Jang Mi, Wally SEO, Korea 2022)
- Cabriolet (CHO Kwang-jin, Korea 2021)
- Chiaksan Mountain (KIM Sun-ung, Korea 2022)
- The Fifth Thoracic Vertebra (PARK Syeyoung, Korea 2022)
- A Good Boy (SON Kyoungwon, Korea 2022)
- Mind Universe (KIM Jin Moo Korea 2022)
- Next Door (YEOM Ji-ho, Korea 2021)
- Thunderbird (LEE Jaewon, Korea 2022)
- Tiger's Trigger (LEE Kang-wook, Korea 2022)
- The Woman in the White Car (Christine KO, Korea 2022)

==== Korean Fantastic: Shorts ====
- House of Existence (JOUNG Yu Mi, Korea 2022)
- Persona (MOON Sujin, Korea 2022)
- The Stranger (SONG Wonchan, Korea 2022)
- Zzom! (KIM Youjune, KIM Hujung, Korea 2022)
- AMEN A MAN (KIM Kyeongbae, Korea 2022)
- Bardo (JUNG Jihyun, Korea 2022)
- Blessedness (PARK Sso, Korea 2022)
- Mr.Review (SHIN Ki-hun, Korea 2022)
- Cold (WON Yu, Korea 2022)
- Movie Rangers (AHN Jungmin, Korea 2021)
- Teatime with Mr. Park (Yu Woo-il, Korea 2022)
- Things that Disappear (KIM Changsoo, Korea 2022)
- The Autumn Poem (PARK Chan-ho, Korea 2022)
- The House of Loss (JEON Jinkyu, Korea 2022)
- Red Mask KF94 (KIM Min Ha, Korea 2022)
- Your Child (HONG Sunyoung, Korea 2022)

==== Korean Fantastic: Series Killer - Taste of Horror ====
- Gapjil (LIM Dae-woong, Korea 2021)
- Hey, Mammons! (AHN Sang-hoon, Korea 2021)
- Jackpot (CHAE Yeo-jun, Korea 2021)
- The Prey (YOON Eunkyoung, Korea 2021)
- The Residents-Only Gym (KIM Yong-gyun, Korea 2021)
- Ding-Dong Challenge (AHN Sang-hoon, Korea 2021)
- Gluttony (CHAE Yeo-jun, Korea 2021)
- Gold Tooth (YOON Eunkyoung, Korea 2021)
- Rehab (LIM Dae-woong, Korea 2021)
- Tick Tock Tick Tock (KIM Yong-gyun, Korea 2021)

==== Korean Fantastic: Series Killer - MONSTROUS ====
- Monstrous 1 (Jang Kun-jae, Korea 2022)
- Monstrous 2 (Jang Kun-jae, Korea 2022)

==== Korean Fantastic: Series Killer - SEEN ====
- Seen (JEON Doo Kwan, Korea 2021)

==== Korean Fantastic: Series Killer - Shortbusters ====
- Boosruck (LEE Tae-An, CHO Hyun Chul Korea 2022)
- The Mine (KIM Gok, KIM Sun, Korea 2022)
- School Caste (KWAK Kyung-taek, Korea 2022)
- Schrödinger’s Deserted Island (HONG Seok-jae, Korea 2022)
- Back to the Hong Kong (KIM Chohee, Korea 2022)
- It’s Alright (JOO Dong-Min, Korea 2022)
- Night Watch (RYU Deok Hwan, Korea 2022)
- Parallel Adventure of Madam Mizy (YOON Sung Ho, Korea 2022)

=== Mad MaxX ===
- Lesson in Murder (Kazuya Shiraishi, Japan 2022)
- Lynch/Oz (Alexandre O. Philippe, USA 2022)
- Mad God (Phil Tippett, USA 2022)
- The Mole Song: Final (MIIKE Takashi, Japan 2021)
- Noise (HIROKI RyuichiJapan 2022)
- Something in the Dirt (Justin BENSON, Aaron MOORHEAD, USA 2021)
- Veneciafrenia (Álex de la IGLEISA, Spain 2021)
- Warning From Hell (Danny PANG, Malaysia, Taiwan 2022)

=== Adrenaline Ride ===
- Alone with You (Emily BENNETT, Justin BROOKS, USA 2021)
- Barbarians (Charles Dorfman, UK 2021)
- Deadstream (Joseph WINTER, USA 2021)
- Deep Fear (Gregory BEGHIN, France 2022)
- The Devil's Deception (Kabir BHATIA, Malaysia 2022)
- The Execution (Lado KVATANIYA, Russia 2021)

=== Metal Noir ===
- Assault (Adilkhan YERZHANOV, Kazakhstan, Russia 2022)
- Gentle (Laszlo CSUJA, Anna NEMES, Hungary 2022)
- Grand Jeté (Isabelle Stever, Germany 2022)
- Immersion (Nicolás POSTIGLIONE Chile, Mexico 2021)
- In Dream (Shin Jai-ho, Korea 2022)
- Manchurian Tiger (Geng Jun, China 2021)
- The Midnight Maiden War (NINOMIYA Ken, Japan 2022)
- Miracle (Bogdan GEORGE APETRI, Romania, Czech Republic, Latvia 2021)
- Runner (Andrius BLAZEVICIUS, Lithuania 2021)
- The Schoolmaster Games (Ylva FORNER, Sweden 2022)
- Unprecedented (Kudo Masaaki, Japan 2021)
- Zalava (Arsalan Amiri, Iran 2021)

=== Merry-Go-Round ===
- Girls In The Cage (KIM Sun-ung, Korea 2022)
- Angry Son (IIZUKA Kasho, Japan 2022)
- ARASHI Anniversary Tour 5✕20 Film: Record of Memories (TSUTSUMI Yukihiko, Japan 2021)
- Believers (JOJO Hideo, Japan 2021)
- DEMIGOD: The Legend Begins (HUANG Wen Chang, Taiwan 2022)
- Dual (Riley STEARNS, Finland, USA 2022)
- Girls, Be Ambitious! (Julian CHOU, Taiwan 2021)
- Iké Boys (Eric MCEVER, USA 2021)
- Jango: Uncharged (Baek Seung-kee, Korea 2022)
- Italo Disco. The Sparkling Sound of the 80s (Alessandro Melazzini, Italy, Germany 2021)
- Jinju’s Pearl (Kim Lokkyoung, Korea 2022)
- King Knight (Richard BATES, Jr., USA 2021)
- Office Royale (SEKI Kazuaki, Japan 2021)
- Please Baby Please (Amanda KRAMER, USA 2022)
- The Pond (Cheng Wei-hao, Taiwan 2021)
- Popran (UEDA Shinichiro, Japan 2021)
- Ring Wandering (Masakazu Kaneko, Japan 2021)
- Terrorizers (Ho Wi-ding, Taiwan 2021)
- Ultrasound (Rob SCHROEDER, USA 2021)
- To the Moon (Scott FRIEND, USA 2021)
- The Cornered Mouse Dreams of Cheese (Isao Yukisada, Japan 2020)

=== Odd Family ===
- Dragon Princess (Jean-Jacques DENIS, Anthony ROUX France 2021)
- The Great Yokai War: Guardians (Takashi Miike, Japan 2021)
- Guthlee Ladoo (Ishrat KHAN, India 2021)
- The Legend of the Christmas Witch: The Origins (Paola Randi, Italy 2021)
- Maika: The Girl From Another Galaxy (Ham TRAN, Vietnam 2022)
- Pororo Movie_Dragon Castle Adventure (KANG Seunghun, Yun Jea Wan, Korea 2022)

=== Strange Hommage ===
- Evil Come, Evil Go (Walt Davis, USA 1972)
- Society (Brian Yuzna, USA 1989)
- Dagon (Stuart Gordon, Spain 2001)
- The Cemetery Under The Moon (NAM Ginam, Korea 1996)
- To Catch a Virgin Ghost (Shin Jungwon, Korea 2004)
- Inferno Rosso: Joe D'Amato on the Road of Excess (Manlio GOMARASCA, Massimiliano ZANIN, Italy 2021)
- Though the Rose has withered (BAEK Jaeho, Korea 2021)

=== XL ===
- Between the Nights (WOO Jeseung, Korea 2022)
- Night Breakers (Gabriel CAMPOY, Guillem LAFOZ, Spain 2021)
- Puppet Story (PARK Se-hong, Korea 2022)
- Rise & Shine (Arnaud BAUR, Switzerland 2022)
- Cage (Andreas VARSAKOPOULOS, Korea 2022)
- The Top of the Tower (PARK Eunsae, Korea 2022)
- Father F***er (Kim Minhoon, Korea 2022)
- For Pete's Sake (Gerald B. Fillmore, USA, Spain 2022)
- Heaven's Door (Kim Gyu-tae, Korea 2021)
- You Will See (Kathleen BU Singapore 2022)
- Chaperone (Sam MAX, USA 2021)
- The Sisters (Muhammad AHMAD, Yazeid SUHAIMI, Malaysia 2021)
- Teratoma (BYEON Jeongwon, Korea 2022)
- The Three Men (LEE Gunhee, Korea 2022)
- Creature (María Silvia ESTEVE Argentina, Switzerland 2021)
- The Way Home (Cha Eun-bin, Korea 2022)
- Don’t Breathe (Milad NASIM SOBHAN, Iran 2022)
- Running Girls (BAK Nana, Korea 2022)
- Salvar (AHN Sangwook, Korea 2022)
- To my Unnie (KIM SHIN Ho-san, Korea 2022)
- The Great Clarke (JEONG Kiyeon, Korea 2022)
- Hidden Road (KIM Cheol-hwi, Korea 2022)
- Kiss Me If You Can (KIM Min Ji, Korea 2021)
- Ruina (Frank LUCAS, Spain 2021)
- Keyboard Warrior (Leo LIU, Taiwan 2022)
- Wall #4 (Lucas CAMPS, The Netherlands, 2021)
- My parent’s reaction to a surprise HUMAN (YOUN Jihye, Korea 2022)
- Sucker (Alix AUSTIN, UK 2022)
- Transcendence (JEONG Hyoseong, Korea 2021)
- Uh-puh! (PARK Dongchae, Korea 2022)
- Absence (JUNG Dahae, Korea 2021)
- Censor of Dreams (Léo BERNE, Raphaël RODRIGUEZ, France 2021)
- Cookie Coffee Dosirak (Kang Min-ji, Kim Hyemi, Lee Kyung-hwa, Han Byung-a, Korea 2022)
- The House of Brick and Stone (Ananth SUBRAMANIAM, Malaysia 2022)
- Clairvoyant (John Luke MIRAFLOR, The Philippines 2021)
- The Martial Arts War (LEE Wishang, Korea 2022)
- Dead Axel (KIM ChanYoung, Korea 2021)
- The Diamond (Vedran RUPIC, Sweden 2021)
- If Only I Could Kill That BASTARD (PYO Gukcheong, Korea 2022)
- James English Academy (KIM Kwonhoan, Korea 2022)
- Baby Boom (Thomas LUNDE, Norway 2021)
- The Cave (KIM Jinman, CHON Jiyoung, Korea 2022)
- Down the Mountain (KIM Joon, Korea 2022)
- It Gets Darker (Firas ABOU FAKHER, Daniel HABIB, Lebanon 2021)
- Aspirational Slut (Caroline LINDY, USA 2021)
- Starfuckers (Antonio MARZIALE, USA 2022)
- The Corner (SONG Hee-sook, Korea 2022)
- Cross (ZANG Minhye, Korea 2022)
- Let's Kill (Max GLESCHINSKI, Germany 2022)
- Visitors (UGANA Kenichi, Japan 2021)
- Atonement (Kaveh AKABER, Sweden 2022)
- Boom-Boom Bang-Bang (Alexandre VIGNAUD, Belgium 2021)
- Headless (BAEK Bason, Korea 2022)
- Not Human (JEON Seongyeol, Korea 2022)
- Backroom Blues (Andreas KYRIACOU, Cyprus 2022)
- Ririka of the Star (SHIOTA Tokitoshi, Japan 2022)
- The Scorching Air (SEO Sang-Woo, Korea 2022)
- Stone Heart (YANG Suhee, Korea 2022)
- Swallow (NAKANISHI Mai, Taiwan, Japan 2021)
- Among-Terrestrials (Lucas PARRA, Spain 2021)
- Can You Hear Me? (LI Nien-hsiu, Taiwan 2022)
- Love Villain (YI Ok Seop, Korea 2022)
- Replacement Driver VLOG (KOO Kyo Hwan, Korea 2022)
- Abyss (Moon Geun-young, Korea 2021)
- Be In My Dream (Moon Geun-young, Korea 2021)
- The Stage (Moon Geun-young, Korea 2021)

=== The Actor, Sol Kyung-gu ===
- Peppermint Candy (Lee Chang-dong, Korea 1999)
- Public Enemy (Kang Woo-suk, Korea 2001)
- Oasis (Lee Chang-dong, Korea 2002)
- Silmido (Kang Woo-suk, Korea 2003)
- Cold Eyes (Cho Ui-seok, Kim Byeong-seo, Korea 2013)
- The Merciless (Byun Sung Hyun, Korea 2017)
- The Book of Fish (Lee Joon-ik, Korea 2019)

=== 39+1 Korean Academy of Film Arts(KAFA) in BIFAN ===
==== 39+1 KAFA in BIFAN: Features ====
- Tinker Ticker (Kim Jung-hoon, Korea 2013)
- Duck Town (YU Ji-young, Korea 2016)
- Socialphobia (Hong Seok-jae, Korea 2014)
- After My Death (KIM Ui-seok, Korea 2017)
- Climbing (KIM Hyemi, Korea 2020)

==== 39+1 KAFA in BIFAN: Shorts ====
- A Drop of Clear Salty Liquid (BOO Jiyoung, Korea 2002)
- The Oldman with Knapsack (PARK Hyun-kyung, Korea 2003)
- Don't Step Out Of The House (JO Sung Hee, Korea 2009)
- The Wish (HEO Jung, Korea 2013)
- My Small Doll House (JOUNG Yumi, Korea 2006)
- High School Girls (PARK Ji Wan, Korea 2008)
- Telepata (KWON Man Ki, Korea 2015)
- Forest (UM Tea Hwa, Korea 2012)
- Intruder (PARK Geun Buem Korea 2014)
- Squid (LEE Sanghak, Korea 2016)
- Home (KIM Bosol, Korea 2019)
- Born Hater (KIM Kyungyeon, Korea 2020)

=== Boys, Be, Love ===
- BL Metamorphosis (KARIYAMA Shunsuke, Japan 2022)
- Cherry Magic! THIRTY YEARS OF VIRGINITY CAN MAKE YOU A WIZARD?.. (KAZAMA Hiroki, Japan 2022)
- Ocean Likes Me (Lee Suji, Korea 2022)
- Oh! Boarding House (PARK Eun Joo, Korea 2021)
- Semantic Error (Kim Soo Jung, Korea 2022)
- What She Likes...(Kusano Shôgo, Japan 2021)

== Awards and winners ==
=== Bucheon Choice ===
==== Bucheon Choice Features ====
- Best of Bucheon (₩20,000,000): You Won't Be Alone by Goran Stolevski, Australia 2021
- Best Director Choice (₩5,000,000): Christian Tafdrup for Speak No Evil
- Jury’s Special Mention: Huesera by Michelle Garza Cervera
- Jury's Choice (₩5,000,000): Vesper by Kristina Buozyte, Bruno Samper
- Audience Award: Sissy by Hannah Barlow, Kane Senes

==== Bucheon Choice Shorts ====
- Best Short Film (₩5,000,000): Lucienne in a World Without Solitude by Geordy Couturiau
- Jury's Choice for short Film (₩3,000,000): Moshari by Nuhash Humayun
- Audience Award for Short Film: Brutalia, Days of Labour by Manolis Mavris

=== Korean Fantastic ===
==== Korean Fantastic: Features ====
- Korean Fantastic Film (KRW 20,000,000): Body Parts by Choe Wonkyung, Jeon Byeong Deok, Lee Gwang Jin, G’sam, KIM Jang Mi and Wally SEO
- Korean Fantastic Best Director (KRW 10,000,000): Park Syeyoung for The Fifth Thoracic Vertebra
- Fantastic Actor: (2 winners)
  - Jung Ryeo-won in The Woman in a White Car by Christine Ko
  - Seo Hyun-woo in Thunderbird by Lee Jae-won
- Fantastic Actor Jury’s Special Mention: Oh Dong-min in Next Door by Yeon Ji-ho
- Korean Fantastic Audience Award: The Fifth Thoracic Vertebra by Park Sye-young
- Nonghyup Award (distribution award, KRW 10,000,000):
  - The Fifth Thoracic Vertebra by Park Sye-young
  - Next Door by Yeon Ji-ho
- Watcha New Talent Award KRW 5,000,000):
  - Thunderbird by Lee Jae-won
  - The Woman in a White Car by Christine Ko

==== Korean Fantastic: Short ====
- Best Korean Short Film (KRW 5,000,000): Persona by Moon Sujin
- Audience Award for Korean Short Film: The Stranger by Song Wonchan
- Watcha New Talent Awards (KRW 5,000,000) (5 winners):
  - Bardo by Jung Ji-hyun
  - Down the Mountain by Kim Joon
  - James English Academy by Kim Kwonhoan
  - The Stranger by Song Wonchan
  - Red Mask KF94 by Kim Min-ha

=== Méliès International Festivals Federation(MIFF) Award for Best Asian Film ===
This award is intended to discover and promote Asian genre films.

- Awardee: The Midnight Maiden War by Ninomiya Ken

=== NETPAC Award ===
This award is given by the Network for the Promotion of Asian Cinema (NETPAC).

- Awardee: Office Royale by Seki Kazuaki

=== Odd Family Award ===
- Pororo: Dragon Castle Adventure by Kang Seung-hun, Yoon Jae-wan

=== Series Film Award ===
- Series Film Award: Squid Game
