= Seo Hyun-woo =

South Korean actor (born 1983)

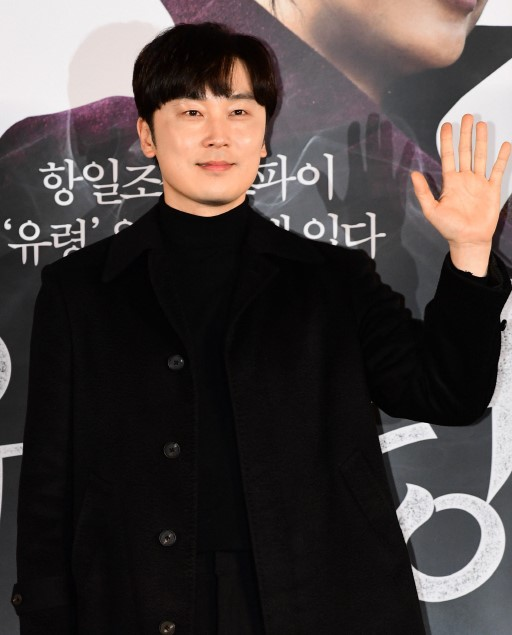
- Seo in December 2022
- Born: November 20, 1983 (age 42); Changwon, South Gyeongsang Province, South Korea
- Education: Korea National University of Arts
- Occupation: Actor
- Years active: 2010–present
- Agent: Just Entertainment

Korean name
- Hangul: 서현우
- Hanja: 徐現宇
- RR: Seo Hyeonu
- MR: Sŏ Hyŏnu

Seo Hyun-woo (born 20 November 1983) is a South Korean actor who began his career on stage and made his debut in a musical in 2010. In the same year, he won an acting award at The 9th Off Daehakro Festival.

Seo faced a period of obscurity that lasted for five years following his graduation. Seo naturally turned his attention to Daehakro plays and independent films. He starred as the main lead in Hyung Seul-woo's film Allergy (2015) that received the grand prize at the Fukuoka Independent Film Festival. He also starred in Shin Dong-young's short film Hatred, which received an official invitation to the 70th Cannes Film Festival.

He is widely recognized for his portrayal of reporter Kim Moo-jin in the 2020 drama Flower of Evil. In 2022, Seo played the role of Sa Cheol-seong in Park Chan-wook's film Decision to Leave. His performance earned him the New Actor Award at the 21st Director's Cut Awards.

== Early life and education ==
Seo was born in Busan on 20 November 1983. He attended elementary and middle school in Tongyeong before moving to Gongju, South Chungcheong Province, to attend Hanil High School, a prestigious boarding school. His alumni include actors Park Jeong-min and Cho Hyun-chul.

In high school, Seo was known for his lively personality and served as both class president and vice president. However, he felt a lack of direction due to the immense academic pressure. This changed at the end of his first year when he saw a school play for the first time, written by his literature teacher. Inspired by the performance, he joined a theater class in his second year, which helped him manage his emotions. Despite his newfound passion for acting, he kept it a secret from his parents and lacked the courage to pursue it professionally.

He enrolled in the English literature department at Kookmin University, believing that excelling in English was important. He soon felt that this path was not for him, as many of his classmates had more experience living in English-speaking countries. Feeling lost and facing challenges, he took a hiatus after his first year. He worked as a bartender in Daehak-ro, where he encountered the local theater scene, which reignited his desire to become an actor.

"Every night, theater people from Daehak-ro came to the bar where I worked. They were like uncle figures, but they engaged in serious discussions every night. They recited lines from Greek tragedies like Sophocles and Aeschylus, and they pondered if Hamlet felt this way or if Othello's anger was like this. I secretly observed them every night. I'm not sure if this expression is appropriate, but it was like 'adults playing make-believe.' It was cool. And I was curious about what made them so obsessed. It was from this time that I made up my mind to become a real actor."

During a phone call, Seo revealed his hiatus to his high school literature teacher, who suggested he take the entrance exam for the Graduate School of Korea National University of Arts. Inspired, Seo decided to drop out from Kookmin University that same day, a decision that caused turmoil within his family. Undeterred, he enrolled in an acting academy in 2003 but left after one month due to its ineffectiveness. He found the classes inconvenient, with a monthly tuition of 850,000 won for only three sessions a week in a class of over 50 students. Seo decided to study independently, renting three films a day from a nearby video store and imitating the acting styles of his favorite actors. He supplemented his practice with professional books. His efforts paid off, and he successfully passed the entrance exam. He was accepted into the Theater Department at Korea National University of Arts. Although he was a few years older than his peers, his determination set him apart. He received a full scholarship for every semester except the first.

== Career ==
=== 2010–2014: Early career ===
After completing his studies, Seo made his acting debut at the age of 27 in a musical. He then appeared in the Korean production of Kiss Me, Kate, a musical based on William Shakespeare's The Taming of the Shrew. From July 9 to August 14, 2010, he played the character Ralph at the National Theater Haeoreum Theater.

That same year, Seo played the male lead, Balroja, in Oleg Askerovich Yernev's play Evening with a Pretty and Lonely Girl. Produced by The Glass Mask Theater Company and directed by Park Sang-ha, the play was part of the 9th Off Daehakro Festival. Staged at the Samil-ro Warehouse Theater in Myeong-dong from November 2 to December, the production was a success, with all tickets selling out. For his performance, Seo received the Acting Award at the festival, earning him critical and public attention.

In 2011, Seo began his on-screen acting career with a role in the film White: The Melody of the Curse (2011). That same year, he took on a darker role as Malcolm in Lee Young-seok's production of Shakespeare's Macbeth. This production was staged by the troupe Elephant Manbo at the Jeongmiso installation theater as part of a performance commemorating the troupe's 25th anniversary and the 2011 Guerrilla Theater Overseas Director Special Exhibition. Seo then reprised his role as Balroja in another run of Evening with a Pretty and Lonely Girl, which was staged at the Small Pine Theater from May 8.

In March 2012, Seo appeared in the three-person play Hamlet, directed by Seong Cheon-mo. In this unique adaptation, he played Campbell, while Ryu Ji-wan played Hamlet and Jeong Soo-young portrayed five different characters, including Ophelia and Queen Gertrude. The play ran at the Seoul Arts Center's Jayu Theater until May 6.

In 2013, Seo had a role as an escort warrior in the KBS Drama Special Devil. Since then, he has been active in plays, dramas, and films. Seo faced a period of obscurity that lasted for five years following his graduation. Determined to make his mark, he diligently visited film companies on a daily basis, submitting his profile and attending auditions without fail. Seo naturally turned his attention to Daehakro plays and independent films. In the process, he appeared in independent films such as 'Jack Boy' and 'Traveler from the North' and performed on stage almost every year.

=== 2014–2020: Independent film, theater and onscreen supporting roles ===
Eventually, Seo's talent was recognized, and he began to establish himself in independent films. In particular, his performance in A Hard Day (2014) and Fatal Intuition (2015) stood out. Seo portrayed Doo-su, a detective in Fatal Intuition. Doo-su suspects Jang-woo (played by Joo Won), of being a murderer. Through his performance, Seo effectively depicted a seasoned character who skillfully balances with the harsh realities of the situation. Seo, being a native of Busan, played a crucial role in assisting Joo Won with his acting in the movie. Joo Won had to deliver all his lines in the Gyeongsang dialect, and for two months, he received private tutoring from Seo. Furthermore, at the director's request, Seo created personalized textbook containing all of Joo Won's lines, which he personally recorded.

In 2014, Seo made his series debut in the MBC morning drama Woman of the Storm, playing the character Peter Yoon. The drama aired from November 3, 2014, to May 15, 2015. Following the series he starred in film Tunnel.

In 2015, he starred in the film Byeong-gu (Allergy). In August 2016, Byeong-gu became the first foreign film to receive the grand prize at the 2016 Fukuoka Independent Film Festival. Also 2015, Seo auditioned for the Korean revival of Sam Shepard's Two-hander play True West, directed by Oh Man-seok and produced by Aligator Theater Company. He was cast in the role of Lee, alternating with Jeon Seok-ho, Kim Jun-won, and Lee Dae-il. They performed opposite Kim Seon-ho, Lee Hyun-wook, and Moon Sung-il, who shared the role of Austin. The play, which ran from August 13 to November 1 at the University Road A Art Hall, ranked first in theater ticket sales on Interpark when tickets were released.

In 2016, Seo made a special appearance in the drama The Good Wife as Baek Min-hyuk, a cold-blooded prosecutor known as the "Knife Holder." He appeared in episodes 7 and 8, broadcast on July 29 and July 30, respectively, and received favorable reviews for his performance. His character confronts Yoon Kye-sang's character while searching for the truth about his lover, who was a victim in a case. To win the trial, he demonstrates his cool-headedness by collecting GPS data from a car's navigator after the evidence inside the vehicle was nullified due to illegal handling.

That same year, Seo did two back-to-back plays with the Aligator Theater Company. He reprised his role as Lee in the Korean encore performance of Sam Shepard's play True West Return. He then appeared in the 2016 revival of Patrick Marber's play Closer, directed by Roh Deok. He was triple-cast as Larry, sharing the role with Bae Seong-woo and Kim Jun-won, and acted opposite actors including Kim Seon-ho, Park Eun-seok, Lee Dong-ha, Kim So-jin, Song Yu-hyeon, Lee Ji-hye, and Park So-dam.

In November 2016, Seo's short films Byeonggu, Jackboy, 6D Theater, and Men in the Basement were introduced on the opening day of the 10th Gyeongnam Independent Film Festival. The festival, hosted by the Gyeongnam Film Association, was held from November 18 to 20 at Lotte Cinema Changwon and Cine Art 'Rhizome'.

In 2017, Seo appeared in a diverse range of five films, including three commercial films: 1987: When the Day Comes, Heart Blackened, and A Taxi Driver. He also acted in the independent film Coffee Noir: Black Brown and the short film Hatred (Baekcheon), in which he had the lead role. His work gained international recognition when Hatred (Baekcheon)received an official invitation to the Cannes International Film Festival. In 2018, Seo appeared in a total of nine films, including The Discloser as Cha Woo-jin, The Vanished as Dong-gu, Seven Years of Night as Detective Lee, A Tiger in Winter as Jeong, Believer as Jeong Il, and Cinema with You as Jung Woo. Additionally, he portrayed a homeroom teacher in the independent film After My Death. Before its theater release, both After My Death and A Tiger in Winter were first screened at the 22nd Busan International Film Festival in October 2017.

"Independent films are relatively disadvantaged compared to commercial films, but that's why they seem more interesting to me. The passion to learn and the desire to grow through work are great. Playing the lead role in an independent film allows me to experience a long breath and experiment with myself. This year, After My Death and A Tiger in Winter were invited to the Busan International Film Festival, and personally, I think it will be a very meaningful year."

In the end of 2018, Seo appeared in the film Beautiful Days, directed by Yoon Jae-ho, which was the opening film of the 23rd Busan International Film Festival. He played the lover of a North Korean defector, portrayed by Lee Na-young.

In 2019, he had a role as the defendant Kang Doo-sik in Hong Seung-wan's film Juror 8. He also appeared in Bring Me Home. That same year, Seo played In Dong-gu in the OCN drama series The Lies Within, directed by Lee Yoon-jung. In the series, his character is the head of the strategic planning office for JQ Group and a loyal subordinate to Chairman Jeong Young-moon (Moon Chang-gil), willing to commit murder for him. While filming an action scene for the series, Seo sustained an injury and focused on rehabilitation at the end of the year. He also served as the emcee for the closing ceremony of the Seoul Independent Film Festival 2019.

=== 2020–present: First lead role, accolades and recent projects ===
In 2020, Seo reunited with director Roh Deok for the SF8 episode "Manshin," where he played In-hong, the original developer of the "Manshin" prophecy app. After selling his technology, In-hong leads a luxurious life guided by the app's predictions. The episode follows Seon-ho (Lee Yeon-hee), a skeptic, and Garam (Lee Dong-hwi), a devout believer, on their journey to find him.

That same year, Seo had notable roles in two films. In Son Jae-gon's Secret Zoo, he played Secretary Oh. He also strengthened his public profile with a role in The Man Standing Next, portraying Chun Doo-hyuk, a character based on Chun Doo-hwan, the former Director of the KCIA and Chief of the Defense Security Command who later became South Korea's fifth president. To embody the role, Seo shaved his head. His performance earned him a nomination for New Male Actor of the Year in the film category at the Director's Cut Awards.

Seo also landed his first lead role in the tvN drama Flower of Evil, a series written by Yoo Jeong-hee, directed by Kim Cheol-gyu, and produced by Studio Dragon and Monster Union. He played Kim Moo-jin, a reporter who is described as carefree, self-centered, and cunning. His character's life becomes complicated when he encounters Do Hyun-soo (Lee Joon-gi), someone from his past who had caused him trauma. Kim Moo-jin also has a romantic relationship with Do Hyun-soo's older sister, Do Hae-soo (Jang Hee-jin).

"It was my first lead role, so I felt pressured, but I was able to take on the role in an interesting way because it changes like a chameleon depending on the situation. I was really moved when I first started receiving calls after auditioning non-stop. I had really mixed emotions. It's my first time doing a melodrama, and it's my first time acting with someone my age. Even in my 20s, I mainly played roles older than my age, such as teacher rather than student, but everything was new to me. I got to discover new sides of myself while playing roles of people my age."

In 2021, Seo participated in Exotic Garden, a live dubbing performance directed by Jeon Gye-soo that combines film with musical theater. The show re-created Love with an Alien, Korea's first color film, which had been restored after being found in a Hong Kong warehouse in 2013, but was missing its sound. Using a script with recorded lines, the performance featured actors doing on-site dubbing and Foley artists creating sound effects. Alongside Seo, the show features musical actors such as Park Si-won, Park Hyeong-gyu, Lee Su-an, and Son Hyun-jung. The show was held at the Seoul Arts Center CJ Towol Theater from April 29 to May 2. It then toured to the Busan Cinema Center Haneul Theater on May 8, the Bupyeong Arts Center Haenuri Theater from July 9 to 10, and the Gimpo Art Hall from October 22 to 24. In September 2021, while participating in this project, Seo signed an exclusive contract with Just Entertainment.

In 2022, Seo appeared in Park Chan-wook's film Decision to Leave. The film was selected to compete for the Palme d'Or at the 2022 Cannes Film Festival, where Park Chan-wook won Best Director. The film was released theatrically in South Korea on June 29, 2022. Seo played Sa Cheol-seong, a character who creates conflict, particularly with Seorae (portrayed by Tang Wei). Seo secured the role after an audition, despite having lost a significant amount of weight at the time. The director, while impressed with his acting, was concerned about his lack of an intimidating physical presence for the character. In order to collaborate with the director, Seo dedicated himself to gaining weight for the role. For his portrayal, he was honored with the New Male Actor of the Year award in the film category at the 21st Director's Cut Awards.

Seo also starred in the film Thunderbird, directed by Lee Jae-won from the Korean Film Academy. The film follows his character, Tae-gyun, a taxi driver searching for his brother's pawned car. The film had its world premiere at the 24th Far East Film Festival on April 27, 2022, and was released theatrically on September 21, 2022, in South Korea. It was also selected at 26th Bucheon International Fantastic Film Festival in 'Korean Fantastic: Features', where it won two awardsand Seo was honored with the Korean Fantastic Actor Award.

A week later, on September 28, 2022, Seo's film Honest Candidate 2 was released. He played the role of Cho Tae-joo. Seo later shared that after the release of his 2020 film The Man Standing Next, Seo watched the first Honest Candidate film and developed an interest in trying the comedy genre. When director Jang Yu-jeong later sent him the script for the sequel, he was initially excited. However, he found the character of Cho Tae-joo challenging, as it was a new role in an already established movie. Concerned about how to naturally integrate the character without disrupting the existing dynamics, he began researching ways to blend in with the original cast members. His casting was officially confirmed on August 6, with principal photography having already begun on July 31, 2021, and wrapping up on October 31.

In November, Seo appeared in the tvN drama Behind Every Star, a Korean adaptation of the French TV series Call My Agent!.He starred alongside Lee Seo-jin, Kwak Sun-young, and Joo Hyun-young, playing Kim Jung-don, a team leader at Method Entertainment, a good manager having a good personality. It premiered on tvN on November 7, 2022, and aired every Monday and Tuesday at 22:30 (KST) for 12 episodes. It is available for streaming on Netflix in selected regions.

In 2024, Seo had three series released on Disney+. He began the year in the series A Shop for Killers, aired from January 17 to February 7. He portrayed Lee Seong-jo, a cold-blooded sniper who spoke with a Jeolla-do dialect. To prepare for the role, which involved close-quarters combat with guns and an axe, he attended action school for three months. His second series, Uncle Samsik, premiered on May 15 and ran until June 19. The show, set in the 1960s, is actor Song Kang-ho's first drama series. Seo played Jung Han-min, an elite soldier from the Military Academy dedicated to military reform. On September 11, Seo starred in the crime comedy Seoul Busters. He played Jeong Jeong-hwan, a detective and former national shooting team member who is also a father of four seeking a promotion.

== Filmography ==
=== Film ===
Key
†	Denotes films that have not yet been released

Feature Film

Year	Title		Role	Notes	Ref.
Year	English	Korean	Role	Notes	Ref.
2011	White: The Melody of the Curse	화이트: 저주의 멜로디	200th Music Fever Flook Director	Bit Part	
2011	The Front Line	고지전	North Korean soldier in Chuncheon	Bit Part	
2012	Love Fiction	러브픽션	Ui-gyu	Bit Part	
2012	The Spy	간첩	Safety house monitor team personnel	Bit Part	
2013	Hope	소원	Paramedic	Bit Part	
2013	The Spy: Undercover Operation	스파이	Situation room agent 5	Bit Part	
2013	Steel Cold Winter	소녀	Math teacher		
2013	The Face Reader	관상	Jin-moo		
2013	The Suspect	용의자			
2014	A Hard Day	끝까지 간다	Oh Ham-ma		
2014	Manhole	맨홀	Male police officer		
2015	The Advocate: A Missing Body	성난 변호사	Junior staff		
2015	Fatal Intuition	그놈이다	Doo-soo		
2015	Veteran	베테랑			
2015	Traveller from the North	북쪽에서 온 여행자	North Korean broker		
2016	Musudan	무수단	First Lieutenant Lee Hyun-suk		
2016	The Bacchus Lady	죽여주는 여자	Doctor		
2016	Hiya	히야	Kim Yong-man		
2016	The Tunnel	터널	SNC fellow reporter		
2017	A Taxi Driver	택시 운전사	Defense Security Command 1		
2017	Heart Blackened	침묵	Thailand branch manager		
2017	1987: When the Day Comes	1987	Prosecutor Lee		
2017	Coffee Noir: Black Brown	커피 느와르: 블랙 브라운	Seung-gyu		
2018	The Discloser	1급기밀	Cha Woo-jin		
2018	The Vanished	사라진 밤	Dong-gu		
2018	Seven Years of Night	7년의 밤	Detective Lee		
2018	A Tiger in Winter	호랑이보다 무서운 겨울손님	Boo-jung		
2018	Believer	독전	Jung-il		
2018	Cinema With You	너와 극장에서	Jung-woo		
2018	After My Death	죄 많은 소녀	Homeroom teacher		
2018	Beautiful Days	뷰티풀 데이즈	Mother's boyfriend		
2019	A Boy and Sungreen	보희와 녹양	Sung-wook		
2019	Juror 8	배심원들	Kang Doo-sik		
2019	Bring Me Home	나를 찾아줘	Police Officer Kim		
2019	Ashfall	백두산	Deputy Department Head		
2019	Flim Adventure	영화로운 나날	Jong-pil		
2020	Secret Zoo	해치지않아	Secretary Oh		
2020	Teuri	테우리	Jjang-gu		
2020	The Man Standing Next	남산의 부장들	Jeon Du-hyeok		
2020	Intruder	침입자	Dr. Han	Cameo	
2020	Somewhere in Between	국도극장	Choi Sang-jin		
2021	New Year Blues	새해전야	Hyo-young's husband	Cameo	
2021	Spiritwalker	유체이탈자	Master Sergeant Baek		
2021	Aloners	혼자 사는 사람들	Neighbor		
2021	The Night Shift	괴기맨숀	Broker		
2022	Love and Leashes	모럴센스	Team Leader Hwang		
2022	Decision to Leave	헤어질 결심	Chul-sung		
2022	Honest Candidate 2	정직한 후보2	Jo Tae-joo		
2022	Thunderbird	썬더버드	Tae-gyun		
2022	Seire	세이레	Woo-jin		
2022	Marui Video	마루이 비디오	Kim PD		
2023	Phantom	유령	Cheong Gye-jang		
2024	My Name Is Loh Kiwan	로기완	Eun-cheol		
2025	Wall to Wall	84제곱미터	Young Jin-ho		

Short Film

Year	Title		Role	Notes	Ref.
Year	English	Korean	Role	Notes	Ref.
2012	Traveler	여행자			
2012	PLUG AND PLAY	신입사원	Hyeon-u		
2013	Motel Aquarium	모텔 아쿠아리움	Hyeon-u	Main role	
2013	AM5:14		Hyeon-u		
2013	Hide And Seek	숨바꼭질	Hyeon-u		
2013	Dirty Hyeri	더티혜리	Hyeon-u		
2014	Jack Boy	잭보이	Hyeon-u	Main role	
2015	Allergy	병구	Byeong-gu	Main role	
2015	6D Theater	6D 극장	King Arthur	Main role	
2016	A Man in the Basement	지하의 남자	Byeong-gi	Main role	
2016	Teach Me	티치 미	Sung-hoon		
2016	Finding Sunshine	안녕의 온도	Hyeon-u		
2017	Hatred	백천	Baek-cheon	Main role	
2017	On Air	교내방송	Hyeon-u		
2017	Call	콜	Hyeon-u		
2018	Apocalypse Runner	종말의 주행자	Dong-shik	Main role	
2020	The Migration-ship	이주선	Hyeon-u		
2020	Digital Video Editing with Adobe Premiere Pro: The Real-World Guide to Set Up and Workflow	그녀를 지우는 시간	Hyeon-u	Main role	

=== Television series ===
Key
†	Denotes television productions that have not yet been released

Year	English		Role	Notes	Ref.
Year	English	Korean	Role	Notes	Ref.
2013	KBS Drama Special: "The Devil"	KBS 드라마 스페셜 - 마귀 - 파발, 지옥을 달리다	Guard warrior	Bit part	
2015	Lady of the Storm	폭풍의 여자	Peter Yun		
2016	The Royal Gambler	대박	Park Pil-hyun		
2016	The Good Wife	굿 와이프	Baek Min-hyuk	Cameo (Ep. 7–8)	
2018	Drama Stage: "Anthology"	드라마 스테이지 - 문집	Min-cheol		
2018	My Mister	나의 아저씨	Section Chief Song Seok-Beom		
2018	The Time	시간	Cheon Soo-cheol		
2019	The Lies Within	모두의 거짓말	In Dong-gu		
2020	SF8: Manxin	에스 에프 에잇: 만신	Detective Kim In-hong		
2020	Flower of Evil	악의 꽃	Kim Moo-jin		
2022	Adamas	아다마스	Kwon Hyun-jo		
2022	Behind Every Star	연예인 매니저로 살아남기	Kim Jung-don		
2023	One Day Off	박하경 여행기	Novelist	Cameo	
2024	A Shop for Killers	킬러들의 쇼핑몰	Lee Seong-jo	Season 1	
2024	Uncle Samsik	삼식이 삼촌	Jung Han-min		
2024	Seoul Busters	강력하진 않지만 매력적인 강력반	Jung Jung-hwan		
2025	Our Movie	우리 영화	Boo Seung-won		
2025	Ms. Incognito	착한 여자 부세미	Lee Don		
2026	Honour	아너	Park Je-yeol		
2026	Climax	클라이맥스	Oh Gwang-jae		
2026	Sold Out on You	오늘도 매진했습니다	Choi Woo-su	Special appearance	
2026	The Ordinary Jackpot	로또 1등도 출근합니다	Yang Joon-ho		

== Stage ==
=== Hosting ===
Hosting appearances
Year	Title	Notes	Ref.
2018	Closing ceremony of 44th Seoul Independent Film Festival	with Kim Hye-na	
2019	Closing ceremony of 45th Seoul Independent Film Festival	with Kim Sae-byeok	
2020	Closing ceremony of 46th Seoul Independent Film Festival	with Lee Sang-hee	
2021	Closing ceremony of 47th Seoul Independent Film Festival	with Lee Sang-hee	
2022	Closing ceremony of 48th Seoul Independent Film Festival	with Gong Min-jeung	
2023	Closing ceremony of 49th Seoul Independent Film Festival	with Gong Min-jeung	
2023	Opening Ceremony of 27th Bucheon International Fantastic Film Festival	with Park Ha-sun	

=== Musical ===
Musical play performances of Seo Hyun-woo
Year	Title		Role	Venue	Date	Ref.
Year	English	Korean	Role	Venue	Date	Ref.
2010	The Organ of My Heart	내 마음의 풍금	Son Yeong-gam	Seoul Arts Center CJ Towol Theater	January 16 to February 21	
2010	Kiss Me, Kate	키스 미 케이트	Ralph	National Theater Haeoreum Theater	July 9 to August 14	
2010	Speedster Santa and Red Nose Dolph	스피드광 산타와 빨간코 돌프	Ensemble casts	K-ARTS Small Art Theater	October 3 to 6	
2021	Live Dubbing Show: Exotic Garden	라이브 더빙쇼: 이국정원 (異國情鴛)	Cheol-go	Seoul Arts Center	April 29 to May 2	
2021	Live Dubbing Show: Exotic Garden	라이브 더빙쇼: 이국정원 (異國情鴛)	Cheol-go	Busan Cinema Center Haneul Theater	May 8	
2021	Live Dubbing Show: Exotic Garden	라이브 더빙쇼: 이국정원 (異國情鴛)	Cheol-go	Bupyeong Arts Center Haenuri Theater	July 9 to 10	
2021	Live Dubbing Show: Exotic Garden	라이브 더빙쇼: 이국정원 (異國情鴛)	Cheol-go	Gimpo Art Hall	October 22 to 24	
2022	Live Dubbing Show: Exotic Garden	라이브 더빙쇼: 이국정원 (異國情鴛)	Cheol-go	Chuncheon Culture and Arts Center	January 14	

=== Theater ===
Theater play performances of Seo Hyun-woo
Year	Title		Role	Venue	Date	Ref.
Year	English	Korean	Role	Venue	Date	Ref.
2010	Evening with a Pretty and Lonely Girl	예쁘고 외로운 여자와 밤을	Valroja	Samil-ro Warehouse Theater in Myeong-dong for a week from	November 2 to December 12	
2011	Macbeth	맥베스	Malcolm	Daehakro Installation Theater Jeongmiso	February 11 to 27	
2011	Evening with a Pretty and Lonely Girl	예쁘고 외로운 여자와 밤을	Valroja	Small Theater Sharing (Formerly known as Little Pine Tree)	April 8 to May 8	
2012	Hamlet	햄릿	Campbell	Seoul Arts Center Jayu Theater	March 31 to May 5	
2012	Mousetrap	쥐덫	Giles Ralston	Daehakro SH Art Hall	August 2 to October 31	
2013	Hamlet	햄릿	Campbell	Seoul Arts Centre Free Small Theatre	September 9 to October 13	
2013	Hamlet	햄릿	Campbell	Small Theatre Gwangya (formerly Daehak-ro Arts Theatre 3)	October 17 to November 24	
2014	Hamlet	햄릿	Campbell	Seoul Arts Center Jayu Theater	August 1 to 31	
2014	Heaven Bean	헤븐빈	Jack	KT&G Sangsang Madang Daechi Art Hall	November 11 to 13	
2015	True West	트루웨스트	Lee	A Art Hall	August 13 to November 1, 2015	
2016	True West Returns	트루웨스트 리턴즈	Lee	Yegreen Theater	June 24 to August 28, 2016	
2016	Closer	클로저	Larry	Yegreen Theater	September 6 to November 13, 2016	
2017	Three Days of Rain	3일간의 비	Pip and Theo	Daehak-ro Art One Theatre 2	July 11 to September 10	

== Awards and nominations ==
Name of the award ceremony, year presented, category, nominee of the award, and the result of the nomination
Award ceremony	Year	Category	Nominee / Work	Result	Ref.
The 9th Off Daehakro Festival	2010	Acting Award	Evening with a Pretty and Lonely Girl	Won	
Blue Dragon Series Awards	2024	Best Supporting Actor	A Shop for Killers	Nominated	
Bucheon International Fantastic Film Festival	2022	Korean Fantastic, Features; Fantastic Actor	Thunderbird	Won	
Director's Cut Awards	2022	Best New Actor in film	The Man Standing Next	Nominated	
Director's Cut Awards	2023	Best New Actor in film	Decision to Leave	Won	
