= Sweet Munchies =

2020 South Korean television series

- Promotional poster
- Hangul: 야식남녀
- Hanja: 夜食男女
- Lit.: Late-Night Snack Man and Woman
- RR: Yasingnamnyeo
- MR: Yasingnamnyŏ
- Genre: Romantic comedy
- Created by: JTBC
- Written by: Park Seung-hye
- Directed by: Song Ji-won
- Starring: Jung Il-woo; Kang Ji-young; Lee Hak-joo
- Ending theme: "Superhero" by The Vane
- Country of origin: South Korea
- Original language: Korean
- No. of episodes: 12

Production
- Producer: Choi Jin-ho
- Running time: 70 minutes
- Production companies: Hello Contents; Stream Media Corporation (Note: A subsidiary of KeyEast)

Original release
- Network: JTBC
- Release: May 25 – June 30, 2020

Sweet Munchies (Korean: 야식남녀) is a 2020 South Korean television series starring Jung Il-woo, Kang Ji-young and Lee Hak-joo. It aired on JTBC from May 25 to June 30, 2020.

== Synopsis ==
Park Jin-sung (Jung Il-woo), a chef who works at a late-night snack restaurant, is struggling to find money to pay for his father's medical bills. When Kim Ah-jin (Kang Ji-young), a television assistant director who is one of his regular clients, asks him if he knows a gay chef who could star in her cooking program, he decides to lie about his sexual orientation and gets the part. Both become involved with fashion designer Kang Tae-wan (Lee Hak-joo) who seems to hide a secret of his own.

== Cast ==
=== Main ===
- Jung Il-woo as Park Jin-sung, a chef who works at the late-night snack restaurant Bistro.
- Kang Ji-young is Kim Ah-jin, a contractual producer who is a regular at Jin-sung's restaurant.
- Lee Hak-joo as Kang Tae-wan, a closeted gay fashion designer who starts collaborating with Jin-sung and Ah-jin.

=== Supporting ===
==== CK Channel ====
- Yang Dae-hyuk as Nam Gyoo-jang, an open recruit producer.
- Kim Soo-jin as Cha Joo-hee, director of the entertainment division.
- Kim Seung-soo as Lee Sang-young, an open recruit producer.
- Park Sung-joon as Noh Jae-soo, a full-time assistant director.
- Gong Min-jeung as Yoo Sung-eun, a freelancer broadcasting scriptwriter.
- Shin Woo-gyeom as Kang Min-soo, the main producer.
- Yang Dae-hyuk as Nam Gyu-jang, a producer.

==== Family members ====
- Choi Jae-hyun as Park Jin-woo, Jin-sung's little brother who is gay.
- Oh Man-seok as Park Hyung-soo, Jin-sung and Jin-woo's father.
- Jang Hyun-sung as Kang In-sik, Kang Tae-wan's father.
- Kim Jung-young as Jin-woo, Jin-sung's mother

== Original soundtrack ==
Sweet Munchies OST

Soundtrack album by Various Artists
- Released: 2020
- Genre: Soundtrack
- Languages: Korean; English
- Labels: Vlending Co., Ltd.

=== Part 1 ===
Released on May 25, 2020
No.	Title	Lyrics	Music	Artist	Length
1.	"Love With You"	U.je	U.je	Lee Jin-ah	2:59
2.	"Love With You" (Inst.)		U.je		2:59
Total length:					5:58

=== Part 2 ===
Released on May 26, 2020
No.	Title	Lyrics	Music	Artist	Length
1.	"Superhero"	Shoon	Shoon	The Vane	2:58
2.	"Superhero" (Inst.)		Shoon		2:58
Total length:					5:56

=== Part 3 ===
Released on June 1, 2020
No.	Title	Lyrics	Music	Artist	Length
1.	"Twinkle" (반짝)	Shoon	Lee Shi-woo	Jung-in	2:50
2.	"Twinkle" (Inst.)		Lee Shi-woo		2:50
Total length:					5:40

=== Part 4 ===
Released on June 8, 2020
No.	Title	Lyrics	Music	Artist	Length
1.	"All Things Will Pass"	Zerobass	Zerobass	Jung Dae-hyun	4:14
2.	"All Things Will Pass" (Inst.)		Zerobass		4:14
Total length:					8:28

=== Part 5 ===
Released on June 15, 2020
No.	Title	Lyrics	Music	Artist	Length
1.	"Life Is Like Cooking" (삶은 요리)	Shoon	Shoon	GOTCHA !	2:53
2.	"Life Is Like Cooking" (Inst.)		Shoon		2:53
Total length:					5:46

=== Part 6 ===
Released on June 22, 2020
No.	Title	Lyrics	Music	Artist	Length
1.	"This Is My First Life"	Shoon	Shoon	Sobo	3:32
2.	"This Is My First Life" (Inst.)		Shoon		3:32
Total length:					7:04

== Ratings ==
Average TV viewership ratings
Ep.	Original broadcast date	Average audience share (Nielsen Korea)
Ep.	Original broadcast date	Nationwide
1	May 25, 2020	1.531%
2	May 26, 2020	1.092%
3	June 1, 2020	0.988%
4	June 2, 2020	1.013%
5	June 8, 2020	0.769%
6	June 9, 2020	0.578%
7	June 15, 2020	0.618%
8	June 16, 2020	0.570%
9	June 22, 2020	0.625%
10	June 23, 2020	0.510%
11	June 29, 2020	0.564%
12	June 30, 2020	0.444%
Average		0.775%
In the table above, the blue numbers represent the lowest ratings and the red numbers represent the highest ratings.; This drama aired on a cable channel/pay TV which normally has a relatively smaller audience compared to free-to-air TV/public broadcasters (KBS, SBS, MBC and EBS).
