= KBS Media =

South Korean production company

KBS Media Ltd.
- Native name: 케이비에스 미디어 주식회사
- Industry: entertainment and media production
- Founded: December 12, 1991; 34 years ago
- Headquarters: Seoul, South Korea
- Area served: South Korea
- Key people: Kwon Sun-woo
- Products: Korean dramas
- Services: TV series production; overseas program import; dubbing
- Owner: Korean Broadcasting System
- Parent: Korean Broadcasting System
- Website: http://www.kbsmedia.co.kr/

KBS Media Ltd. (Korean: 케이비에스 미디어 주식회사) is a South Korea-based television production company. It is a subsidiary of the Korean Broadcasting System (KBS).

== List of works ==
=== As production company ===
Year	Title	Network	Notes
1999–2009	The Clinic for Married Couples: Love and War (season 1)	KBS2	
2006	Dae Jo-yeong	KBS2	
2006	Hwang Jini	KBS2	Olive9
2009	Partner	KBS2	
2009	Empress Cheonchu	KBS2	
2010	Marry Me, Mary!	KBS2	with Asia Contents Center (ACC) Korea
2011	The Princess' Man	KBS2	
2013	The Queen of Office	KBS2	with MI Inc. and The Queen of Office Production Partners
2013	The Blade and Petal	KBS2	Love Letter
2014	Gunman in Joseon	KBS2	
2014	The King's Face	KBS2	with The King's Face Production Partners
2014	Big Man	KBS2	with Kim Jong-hak Production
2014	Jeong Do-jeon	KBS2	
2015	Assembly	KBS2	with RaemongRaein and Assembly Production Partners
2015	All About My Mom	KBS2	with All About My Mom Production Partners
2015	Oh My Venus	KBS2	with Mong-jak-so Co. Ltd. and ONDA Entertainment
2016	Love in the Moonlight	KBS2	with Love in the Moonlight Production Partners
2016	Jang Yeong-sil	KBS2	
2017	Ms. Perfect	KBS2	with Ms. Perfect Production Partners
2017	Introverted Boss	tvN	with Studio Dragon
2017	Meloholic	OCN	
2018	Are You Human?	KBS2	
2018	Lovely Horribly	KBS2	with HB Entertainment and Lovely Horribly Production Partners
2019	Two Hearts	YouTube, Naver TV, KakaoTV and KBS World	with K League
2026	The Husband	KBS2	Red Nine Pictures
