= The Husband (TV series) =

2026 South Korean television series

- Promotional poster
- Hangul: 결혼의 완성
- Lit.: The Completion of Marriage
- RR: Gyeolhonui wanseong
- MR: Kyŏrhonŭi wansŏng
- Genre: Romantic thriller
- Written by: Jung Jae-ha
- Directed by: Kim Jung-hyun; Kim Min-tae
- Starring: Namkoong Min; Lee Seol; Kim Dae-myung; Lee Sang-hee
- Country of origin: South Korea
- Original language: Korean
- No. of episodes: 12

Production
- Production companies: Rednine Pictures; KBS Media

Original release
- Network: KBS2
- Release: July 4 – August 9, 2026

The Husband (Korean: 결혼의 완성) is a 2026 South Korean romantic thriller television series written by Jung Jae-ha, directed by Kim Jung-hyun and Kim Min-tae, and starring Namkoong Min, Lee Seol, Lee Sang-hee and Kim Dae-myung. The series centered around Kang Tae-ju, a man who becomes both a fugitive and a pursuer after his estranged wife is kidnapped the day after the wife disagreed to divorce to make his life difficult. To save her from a ruthless criminal, he is forced into a desperate struggle that uncovers deep-seated secrets surrounding their marriage.

Produced by Red Nine Pictures and KBS Media, it aired on KBS2 from July 4, to August 9, 2026, every Saturday and Sunday at 21:20 (KST). It is also available for streaming on Disney+.

== Synopsis ==
The life of neurosurgeon and hospital director Kang Tae-ju is upended following a discussion of divorce with his estranged wife, Ko Se-yun, the chairwoman of Uri Hamkke Hospital. The following day, Se-yun is abruptly kidnapped, plunging Tae-ju into an extreme crisis. The abduction is orchestrated by Noh Man-hee, a criminal operating under the guise of a local academy director. As Tae-ju desperately fights to save his wife from the perpetrators, he becomes entangled in a volatile web of deception that forces him to simultaneously operate as a fugitive from the law and a pursuer of the kidnappers. Along the way, he encounters Kim Kyung-ae, a mysterious woman who appears before the captive Se-yun, exuding a strange, unsettling presence despite her kind behavior.

== Cast and characters ==
=== Main ===
- Namkoong Min as Kang Tae-ju, director of Uri Hamkke Hospital and a neurosurgeon
- Lee Seol as Ko Se-yun, Tae-ju's wife and chairwoman of Uri Hamkke Hospital
- Kim Dae-myung as Noh Man-hee, owner and operator of a computer academy
- Lee Sang-hee as Kim Kyung-ae, a mysterious woman who suddenly appears before Se-yun
- Park Byung-eun as Lee Soo-hyung, a former police officer who runs a private investigation agency

=== Supporting ===
Se-yun's family

- Jang Gwang as Go Dong-chan, Se-yun's father and the founder of Uri Hamkke Hospital
- Oh Min-ae as Choi Suk-young, Se-yun's mother

Tae-ju's family

- Cha Mi-kyung as Yoo Jung-won, Tae-ju's mother
- Kwon Hyuk as Kang Tae-young, Tae-ju's brother

People of Uri Hamkke Hospital

- Woo Ji-hyun as Choi Chi-woong, Deputy Director and a neurosurgeon
- Jo Yun-seo as Cha Myung-hee, a psychiatrist
- Jeon Kwang-jin as Ha Jung-soo, Chief of Neurosurgery

Seongjin Police Station, Violent Crimes Team 1

- Lee Seok as Jang Do-sik, Team Leader of Violent Crimes Team 1 at Seongjin Police Station
- Ryu Yeon-seok as Choi Hyun-soo, an inspector of Violent Crimes Team 1 at Seongjin Police Station
- Lee Hyung-joo as Oh Seung-taek, the youngest member of Violent Crimes Team 1 at Seongjin Police Station

== Production ==
=== Development ===
KBS announced a romantic thriller series penned by screenwriter Jung Jae-ha and helmed by director Kim Jung-hyun. Later, Kim Min-tae was added as co-director and co-produced by Rednine Pictures and KBS Media. The production received financial support from the Broadcasting and Telecommunications Development Fund of the Korea Media and Communications Commission.

=== Casting ===
The casting process was revealed through several media reports throughout mid-2025. On May 13, Ilgan Sports reported that Namkoong Min would lead the series and marks a significant return to KBS following a string of award-winning performances on other networks. On September 18, Ilgan Sports reported that Lee Seol was cast to play the female lead. On November 20, SPOTV News reported Kim Dae-myung's addition to the project.

The full main cast line-up was officially finalized on May 27, 2026, with the inclusion of Lee Sang-hee.

=== Filming ===
Principal photography began in November 2025.

== Release ==
In May 2025, The Husband was reported to be broadcast on KBS in 2026. By January 2026, Disney+ confirmed it is scheduled to be released on their platform in late 2026. It was confirmed that the series would premiere on KBS2 on July 4, 2026, airing every Saturday and Sunday at 21:20 (KST). This marked the revival of the KBS weekend miniseries time slot, which had been on hiatus for five months since the conclusion of To My Beloved Thief in February 2026.

== Viewership ==
The Husband : South Korea viewers per episode (millions)

Season	Episode number												Average
Season	1	2	3	4	5	6	7	8	9	10	11	12	Average
1	0.836	1.213	0.954	1.347	0.930	1.200	0.856	1.327	1.448	1.325	1.388	1.602	1.202

Source: Audience measurement performed nationwide by Nielsen Korea.

Average TV viewership ratings
Ep.	Original broadcast date	Average audience share (Nielsen Korea)	
Ep.	Original broadcast date	Nationwide	Seoul
1	July 4, 2026	4.4% (8th)	4.0% (8th)
2	July 5, 2026	6.4% (5th)	5.5% (5th)
3	July 11, 2026	5.3% (3rd)	4.9% (5th)
4	July 12, 2026	7.2% (3rd)	6.7% (3rd)
5	July 18, 2026	5.0% (9th)	4.4% (9th)
6	July 19, 2026	6.4% (3rd)	6.0% (3rd)
7	July 25, 2026	4.8% (6th)	3.9% (9th)
8	July 26, 2026	7.3% (3rd)	6.0% (3rd)
9	August 1, 2026	7.5% (3rd)	6.9% (3rd)
10	August 2, 2026	7.2% (3rd)	6.2% (3rd)
11	August 8, 2026	7.5% (3rd)	6.9% (3rd)
12	August 9, 2026	8.5% (3rd)	7.6% (3rd)
Average		6.5%	5.8%
In the table above, the blue numbers represent the lowest ratings and the red numbers represent the highest ratings.
