= Fatal Intuition =

- Poster
- Directed by: Yun Jun-hyeong
- Written by: Yun Jun-hyeong
- Produced by: Yoon Il-joong
- Starring: Joo Won; Yoo Hae-jin; Lee Yoo-young
- Production company: Sang Sang Film
- Distributed by: CGV Arthouse
- Release date: October 28, 2015
- Running time: 108 minutes
- Country: South Korea
- Language: Korean
- Box office: $7.03 million

Fatal Intuition (Korean: 그놈이다; RR: Geunomida; lit. 'It's Him') is a 2015 South Korean crime thriller film written and directed by Yun Jun-hyeong.

== Plot ==
Jang-woo and Eun-ji are orphaned siblings living in a small seaside town. They are very close, having only each other to rely on after their parents died. Jang-woo is saving up to move to the city so that his younger sister Eun-ji will have better opportunities once she graduates from high school. But one day Eun-ji suddenly disappears, and she turns up dead three days later, her body bruised all over and dumped in a large bucket of water at their washhouse. No witnesses and evidence to the crime can be found. Jang-woo turns to shamanism, but during the ritual to send Eun-ji's spirit to heaven in peace, he notices a suspicious man and takes the latter's behavior as Eun-ji's hint from the afterlife to find her killer.

Si-eun has been ostracized by the townspeople for her mysterious psychic ability to foresee death. She received a premonition of the death of her only friend Eun-ji, but stayed silent. Now wracked with guilt, Si-eun approaches Jang-woo to help him with the clues in her vision. She saw fragmented images related to the murder, but not the face of the killer. The duo begins tracking down a number of other murder cases suspected to have been done by the same person. Then Si-eun sees premonitions of the next target, and Jang-woo goes to the location where she predicts the murder will take place to catch the perpetrator. There, he encounters Pharmacist Min, known as the kindest person in town. Jang-woo becomes absolutely certain that the pharmacist is the serial killer, but the police refuses to investigate Min due to his upstanding reputation. Obsessed with avenging his sister, Jang-woo decides to take matters into his own hands, while Si-eun has another vision of the next murder.

== Cast ==
- Joo Won as Jang-woo
- Yoo Hae-jin as Pharmacist Min
- Lee Yoo-young as Shi-eun
- Ryu Hye-young as Eun-ji
- Lee Jun-hyeok as Myeong-gyu
- Kim Young-woong as Man-cheol
- Seo Hyun-woo as Doo-soo
- Kim Min-seo as Soo-ji
- Jang In-sub as Detective
- Son Sung-chan as Father of Pharmacist Min
- Yoon Da-kyung as Cha-seon
- Min Sung-wook as Yong-han
- Oh Hee-joon as High school student
- Nam Jin-bok as Haeng-seok
- Yeo Min-joo as Ryeong-ha
- Kim Kwak-kyung-hee as Grocery store woman
- Choi Yoo-song as Female shaman

== Box office ==
Fatal Intuition was released in theaters on October 28, 2015. It opened on top of the South Korean box office, earning ₩4.87 billion (US$4.27 million) from 628,000 admissions on 681 screens over its first five days. This represents the best opening weekend for CGV Arthouse, cinema chain CJ CGV's distribution subsidiary. On its second weekend, the film grossed ₩1.18 billion, reaching ₩7.43 billion in total.

== Real-life inspiration ==
The film is based on a true story of a female college student found dead in Busan in 1991, and her death was honored in a Cheondo ceremony. But when performing the final ritual that involves throwing rice into the sea using a bowl attached to a long piece of red fabric, the fabric stretched tight and suddenly snapped. Then the empty bowl floated back to the shore to stop in front of one young man. The father of the dead girl instinctively felt that he was the culprit, but there was no tangible evidence to prove he was.
