= Thunderbird (2022 film) =

2022 South Korean crime action film

- Promotional poster
- Hangul: 썬더버드
- RR: Sseondeobeodeu
- MR: Ssŏndŏbŏdŭ
- Directed by: Lee Jae-won
- Written by: Lee Jae-won
- Produced by: Park Jong-chan
- Starring: Seo Hyun-woo; Lee Myeong-ro; Lee Seol
- Cinematography: Jeong Grim
- Edited by: Lee Jae-won
- Music by: Gisulbu
- Production company: Korean Film Academy
- Distributed by: Triple Pictures Co., Ltd.
- Release dates: April 27, 2022 (Far East Film Festival); September 21, 2022 (South Korea)
- Running time: 97 minutes
- Country: South Korea
- Language: Korean
- Box office: est. ₩50 million (US$43,708.2)

Thunderbird (Korean: 썬더버드; RR: Sseondeobeodeu) is a 2022 South Korean crime action film directed by Lee Jae-won, starring Seo Hyun-woo, Lee Myeong-ro, and Lee Seol. It had its world premiere at the 24th Far East Film Festival on April 27, 2022, and was released theatrically on September 21, 2022, in South Korea.

== Synopsis ==
Tae-min calls his elder brother Tae-gyun, a taxi driver asking for help. He wants him to get his car 'Thunderbird' back, which was pawned along with lot of money that he won from gambling. Now Tae-gyun urgently needs money, Tae-min, a gambling addict is deep in a debt, and Mi-young, Tae-min's girlfriend, a former casino dealer, all go out to get the car back. But nothing goes according to their plan. Towards the end of the night, Tae-gyun decides to ditch them and get the money all alone.

== Cast ==
- Seo Hyun-woo as Tae-gyun
- Lee Seol as Mi-young
- Lee Myeong-ro as Tae-min
- Park Seung-tae as Ok-sun
- Kim Gyu-baek as Jun-mo
- Choi Euna as In-suk
- Ahn Il-kwon as Ki-chul

== Release ==
It had its world premiere at the 24th Far East Film Festival on April 27, 2022. It was also selected at 26th Bucheon International Fantastic Film Festival in 'Korean Fantastic: Features', where it won two awards.

It was released theatrically in South Korea on September 21, 2022.

== Reception ==
Pierce Conran reviewing the film for Udine Film Festival in ScreenAnarchy appreciated the performance of Seo Hyun-woo writing, "Seo delivers another strong, edgy and vulnerable performance as Tae-gyun." Conran also praised the deft handling of director Lee, stating, "Lee kept his finger on the pulse of the story, his careful consideration of lighting, and particular attention to the film's soundscape cranked up the tension at all the rights moments." Concluding Conran opined, "Thunderbird is another promising graduation project from KAFA and with any luck director Lee will be afforded a chance in the commercial arena soon." Panos Kotzathanasis writing in HanCinema praised the performances of cast writing, "movie, benefiting the most by the excellent acting of Lee Myeong-ro as Tae-min, Lee Seol as Mi-young, Park Seung-tae as the catalytic pawn-shop owner, but most of all, Seo Hyun-woo as Tae-gyun". Concluding the review Kotzathanasis wrote, "Thunderbird is a very interesting film, particularly rewarding simply because it manages to stray away from the norms of the crime thriller and for Seo Hyun-woo's acting."

== Awards and nominations ==
Name of the award ceremony, year presented, category, recipient/nominee of the award, and the result of the nomination
Award ceremony	Year	Category	Recipient	Result	Ref.
Bucheon International Fantastic Film Festival	2022	Korean Fantastic, Features; Fantastic Actor	Seo Hyun-woo	Won	
Bucheon International Fantastic Film Festival	2022	Watcha New Talent Award	Lee Jae-won	Won	
