= Lee Seol (actress, born 1993) =

South Korean actress (born 1993)

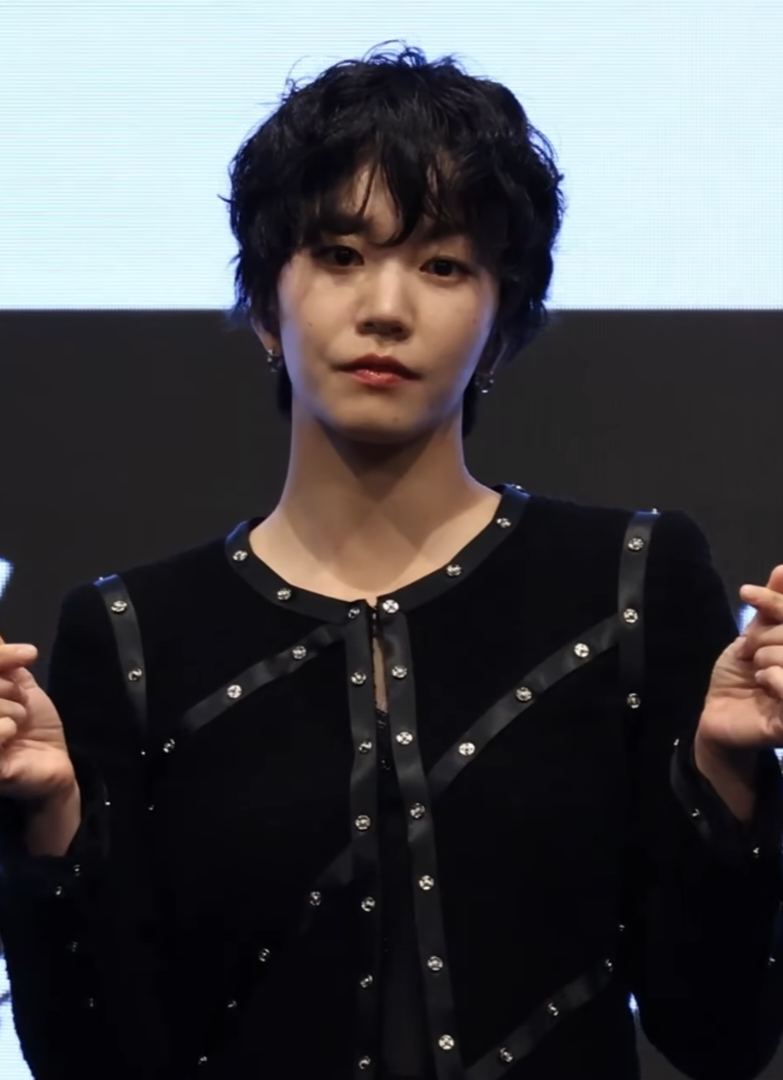
- Lee in July 2026
- Born: Kang Min-jung; April 13, 1993 (age 33); Cheongdo County, North Gyeongsang Province, South Korea
- Education: Sungshin Women's University
- Occupation: Actress
- Agent: 935 Entertainment

Korean name
- Hangul: 강민정
- RR: Gang Minjeong
- MR: Kang Minjŏng

Stage name
- Hangul: 이설
- RR: I Seol
- MR: I Sŏl

Lee Seol (Korean: 이설; April 13, 1993), born Kang Min-jung (강민정), is a South Korean actress. She is best known for her role in the television series Less Than Evil (2018–2019), which earned her a Baeksang Arts Award nomination.

== Career ==
Lee Seol made her acting debut in 2018 in the films Herstory, a cameo in I Have a Date with Spring and a short film, A Room of One's Own. She also made several television series appearance, such as After the Rain and MBC's Less Than Evil.

In February 2022 Lee signed exclusive contract with Just Entertainment, after the contract with her former agency expired.

== Filmography ==
=== Film ===
Year	Title	Role	Notes	Ref.
2018	Herstory	Hye-soo		
2018	I Have a Date with Spring	Female University Student		
2018	A Room of One's Own	Ji-young	Short film	
2019	The Divine Fury	Seol	Cameo	
2019	My Punch-Drunk Boxer	Ji-yeon		
2021	Waiting for Rain	Gong So-yeon		
2021	The Cursed: Dead Man's Prey	Jessy		
2022	Thunderbird	Mi-young		
2025	Somebody	Hae-yeong		
TBA	Days of Green			
TBA	People you' can trust			

=== Television series ===
Year	Title	Role	Notes	Ref.
2018	After the Rain	Yeong-ran		
2018	Less Than Evil	Eun Sun-jae		
2019	When the Devil Calls Your Name	Lee Kyeong		
2023	Between Him and Her	Han Seong-ok		
2025	Our Movie	Chae Seo-young		
2026	Doctor on the Edge	Lee Hwa-young	Special appearance	
2026	The Husband	Go Se-yoon		

=== Web series ===
Year	Title	Role	Notes	Ref.
2020	Amanza	Min-jung		
2021–2023	D.P.	Shin Hye-yeon	Guest role in season 1; supporting role in season 2	
2021	One Ordinary Day	Seo Soo-jin		
2026	Bloodhounds	In-seo	Season 2; Cameo	

== Theater ==
Year	Title	Role	Venue	Date	Ref.
2023	Othello (오셀로)	Desdemona	CJ Towol Theatre	May 12 to June 4	

== Awards and nominations ==
Year	Award	Category	Nominated work	Result	Ref.
2018	37th MBC Drama Awards	Excellence Award, Actress in a Monday-Tuesday Miniseries	Less Than Evil	Nominated	
2018	37th MBC Drama Awards	Best New Actress	Less Than Evil	Won	
2018	32nd KBS Drama Awards	Excellence Award, Actress in a One-Act/Special/Short Drama	After the Rain	Won	
2019	55th Baeksang Arts Awards	Best New Actress	Less Than Evil	Nominated	
