= Gong Min-jeung =

South Korean actress (born 1986)

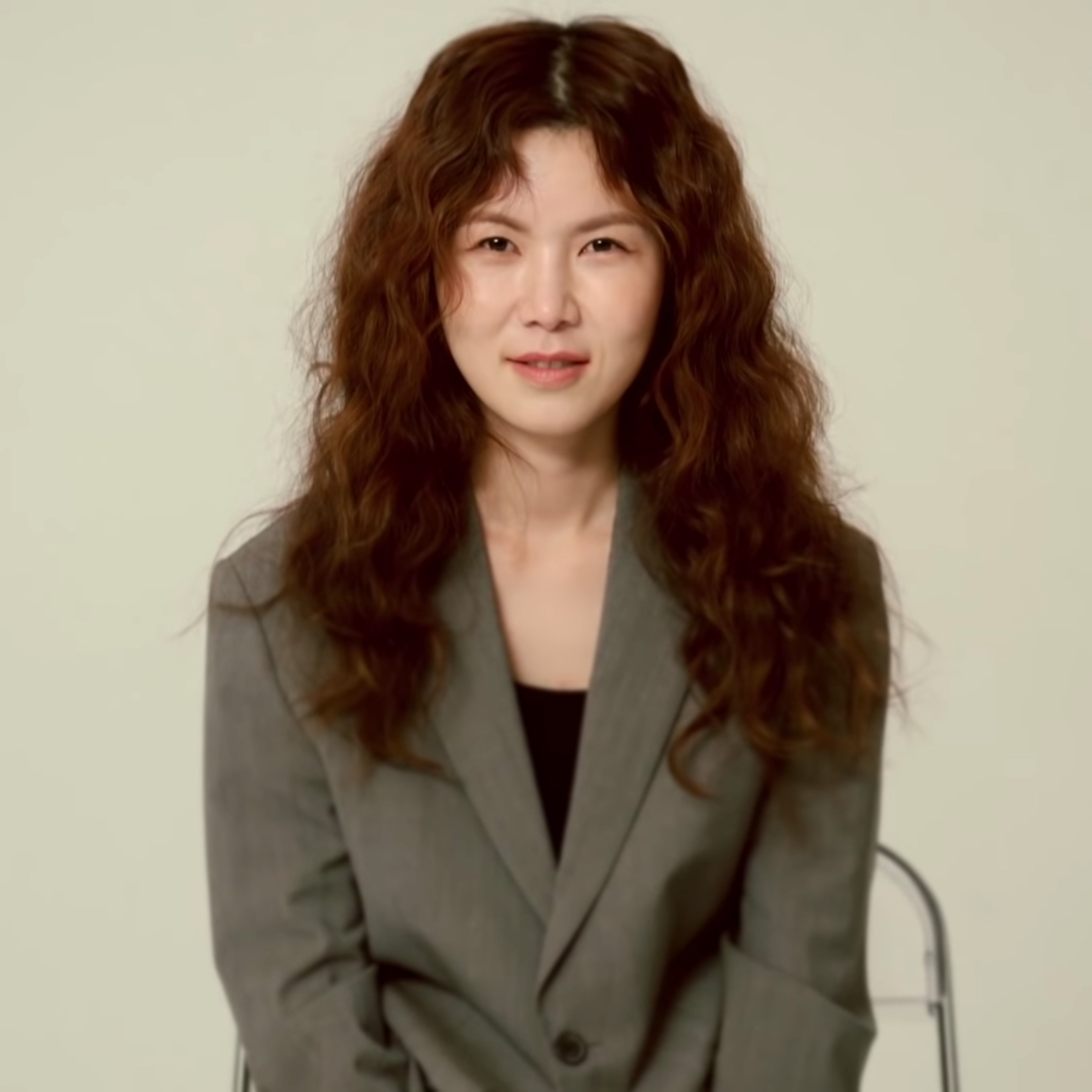
- Gong in 2020
- Born: Kim Min-jung; 30 September 1986 (age 39); Seoul, South Korea
- Other name: Kim E-jung
- Education: Konkuk University (BFA in Film Studies)
- Occupation: Actress
- Years active: 2011–present
- Agent: Fantagio
- Height: 169 cm (5 ft 7 in)
- Spouse: Jang Jae-ho (m. 2024)
- Children: 1

Korean name
- Hangul: 김민정
- RR: Gim Minjeong
- MR: Kim Minjŏng

Stage name
- Hangul: 공민정
- RR: Gong Minjeong
- MR: Kong Minjŏng
- Website: Agency Official Website

Kim Min-jung (Korean: 김민정; born 30 September 1986), known professionally as Gong Min-jeung (공민정), is a South Korean actress recognized for her work in theater, television dramas and independent cinema. She is best known for her roles in drama series Hometown Cha-Cha-Cha (2021) and Marry My Husband (2024). For her performance as prosecutor Na Ye-jin in the 2022 SBS drama One Dollar Lawyer, she received the Best Supporting Actress Award at the 2022 SBS Drama Awards. Her television career also includes notable supporting roles in Temperature of Love (2017), Familiar Wife (2018), and Sweet Munchies (2020).

In addition to her television work, Kim is a prolific figure in independent film. She is a frequent collaborator of director Hong Sang-soo, appearing in his films Yourself and Yours, On the Beach at Night Alone, and Grass. In 2020, she won the Fantastic Best Actor Special Mention Award in the 24th Bucheon International Fantastic Film Festival for Zombie Crush: Heyri.

== Early life and education ==
Born on 30 September 1986 in Jongno District, Seoul, Kim Min-jung was a shy child whose personality reportedly became more outgoing following the birth of her younger brother. Her interest in comedy and acting developed during her school years, catalyzed by a favorable response to a class president election speech and her attendance at a performance of the musical Subway Line 1.

Although initially hesitant to pursue a career in the performing arts, Kim later enrolled in the Konkuk University. She subsequently graduated with a bachelor's degree from the university's Film Art Department.

== Career ==
=== 2009 to 2014: Early career ===
In 2009, Kim made her acting debut in A Perfect Sight, which won Best Short Film at the 30th Blue Dragon Film Awards. After graduating, she appeared in various independent and low-budget films. In 2011, she ventured into theater, debuting in the open-run play Rooftop Cat as a multi-girl.

Under her stage name Kim E-jeong, she made her feature film debut in Kim Seung-hyun's independent film Your Time is Up, where she portrayed Hee-young, a femme fatale and bar hostess. After appearing on invitation at the New Currents section of the Busan International Film Festival to positive reviews, Kim described herself as motivated to further her career.

In 2014, Kim starred as the female lead in the short film A Familiar Taste, directed by Kim In-sun. She played Kyung-eon, an elementary school teacher facing her father's absence following her mother's remarriage. The film, which explored themes of distance and reconnection, appeared at several film festivals, winning some awards.

In the following year Kim acted in short films Sunshine. Also in 2015, she starred in the film Byeong-gu (Allergy), opposite actor Seo Hyun-woo, which won the Grand Prize at the 2016 Fukuoka Independent Film Festival.

=== 2016 to 2017: Rising career in independent film industry ===
In 2016 Kim reunited with Seo Hyun-woo in Choi Ki-yoon's independent film A Man in the Basement, in the supporting role.

The short film Love Triangle, directed and written by Hyung Seul-woo and produced by Cho Hyun-yeol, premiered in 2016 at the 42nd Seoul Independent Film Festival in the Special Invitation Category. The story follows close friends Min-ji (Kim Min-jung) and Han-na (Kim Han-na), both in love with Jun-ho (Jo Hyeong-rae), as they experience an awkward moment while driving to the beach. In 2017, the film was also featured at several festivals: the 27th Yubari International Fantastic Film Festival in Japan, the 16th Mise-en-scène Short Film Festival the 11th Guam International Film Festival, where Kim Han-na won the Acting Award, and the 3rd Gosichon Short Film Festival, where it received the Silver Award. In 2018, it was invited to the 1st Hongseong International Short Film Festival in the Domestic Competition.

Kim also acted in Kwon Hang's short film Terrific Weather. It was screened at the 19th Korea National University of Arts' Film Department Graduation Film Festival in February 2017. The movie begins with weather forecaster Yeon-joo (played by Kim Min-jung) predicting the weather. The story revolves around people who perceive weathercasters as mere eye candy for broadcasting rather than professionals are discussing different aspects.

In the same year, Kim achieved a career milestone through her supporting roles in two feature films by Hong Sang-soo, namelyYourself and Yours, followed by On the Beach at Night Alone. Also in 2017, she made her television debut in the SBS drama series Temperature of Love.

=== 2017 to 2019: Rebrand with new the stage name and further acclaim in independent film industry ===
In 2018, she received acclaim for her performances in the drama Familiar Wife, where she played a supporting role. She was also cast as the lead in Hong Sang-soo's film Grass (2018), credited as Gong Min-jeung, her new stage name. She portrayed Mi-na, who meets Hong-soo (Ahn Jae-hong) at a coffeehouse. She initially mentions a planned trip to Europe, later revealed as a lie. Their conversation turns sour when they discuss a deceased mutual friend, with Mi-na insisting they both share some responsibility. Notably, Grass also featured actors including Kim Min-hee, Jeong Jin-young, Ki Joo-bong, Seo Yeong-hwa, and Kim Sae-byeok. Grass had its premiere at the 68th Berlin International Film Festival on 16 February 2018, and it was also screened in the "Korean Cinema Today – Panorama" program at the 23rd Busan International Film Festival. In the same year, Gong also starred in commercial feature films The Vanished.

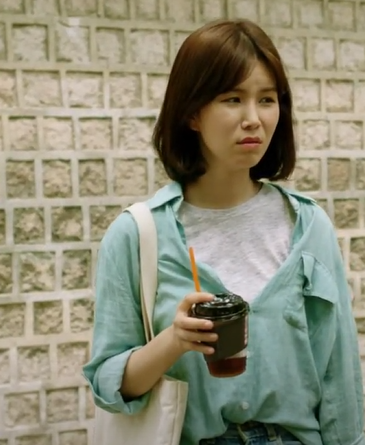
Gong in short film Coming of Age (2018)

In that same year, Gong also did several independent film projects. In Oh Jeong-min's short film Coming of Age, Gong acted opposite Kim Mi-kyung as Baek-seol, a 29-year-old college student in Seoul facing a crossroads after failing to secure a full-time job. The film was invited to several festivals in 2018, including the 16th Asiana International Short Film Festival, the 19th Jeonju International Film Festival, the 17th Mise-en-scène Short Film Festival, the 19th Daegu Short Film Festival, the 23rd Indie Forum New Film Exhibition and the 20th Jeongdongjin Independent Film Festival. In the following year, it was also invited to the 17th Florence Korean Film Festival.

In Lee Ga-hong's short film I Should Have Killed That Bastard, Gong acted alongside Lim Seong-mi, Kim Ye-eun, and Jeong Soo-ji. The story revolves around the crisis faced by the drama "Descendants of Unicorn" due to the departure of male actors. Officials, unable to halt the airing, convene an emergency response meeting. It was screened at the 2018 20th Jeongdongjin Independent Film Festival and the 17th Mise-en-scène Short Film Festival. In Park Je-beom's independent film I Am Home, Gong portrayed Gyeong-ran, the best friend of Lee Yoo-young's character Eun-seo. The film was premiered in the 'Today - Panorama' section of the Korean Film Festival at the 24th Busan International Film Festival in October.

"I was satisfied with every scene. When filming the scene where the three siblings are riding in the car together, the three actors seemed like real siblings. I liked the scene with the three of them in one room, I liked the scene where they chatted with their aunt, and although it's a shame it was edited out in the end, I really liked the scene where Eun-young comforts Ji-young by hugging her and telling her not to get sick. I thought every scene shined. Even though the screenplay was much shorter than planned, I felt that the audience liked the scenes in which Eunyoung appeared. The character of Eun-young has such energy, and she believes that this was possible because she is Min-jeong. She is a character I love."

— Director Kim Do-young talks about Gong Min-jeung, Cine21 Interview

Also in 2019, she reached a career milestone by taking on the role of Kim Eun-young, the eldest of three siblings, in Kim Do-young's feminist-themed film Kim Ji-young: Born 1982. Gong expressed a strong desire to portray Eun-young during auditions, stating her preference despite being offered other roles. Director Kim Do-young, moved by Gong's audition, wiped away her tears and remarked that her performance was exceptional, saying she couldn't envision anyone else in the role. Released in October 2019, the film, based on the novel of the same name, received numerous accolades and achieved commercial success, with 3.7 million admissions and grossing $27.16 million.

In the omnibus film Midday Picnic, Gong appeared in the third segment titled "Call Me If You Need Me," directed by Lim Oh-jeong. The film premiered at the 44th Seoul Independent Film Festival in November 2019. The storyline follows Choi Young-shin (portrayed by Gong), who leaves home after a disagreement with her husband and unexpectedly visits Woo-hee (Lee Woo-jeong), a freelance designer in her 30s living alone. The film explores themes of emotional coldness and the longing for warmth, highlighting Young-shin's unawareness of her own loneliness and her realization of being stuck in a stagnant phase of life.

Gong's performances in Hong Sang-soo's films, along with her role in Midday Picnic, garnered significant attention from industry professionals, who praised her as a talented actress. As her reputation grew, Gong continued to receive opportunities to participate in various projects. In November 2019, Gong was featured in the 4th Oh Theater Audience Programmer Film Festival held at Oh Theater, an independent film venue. The festival took place from 18 to 24 November. As part of the event, three of Gong's short films were showcased on 19 November: The Taste of Dad (Kim In-seon, 2014), Coming of Age Ceremony (Oh Jeong-min, 2018), and Two Waters and a Lighter (Cho Hee-young, 2019). In December 2019, Gong made a supporting appearance in the second feature-length film by director Lee Sang-deok, Film Adventure.

In March 2020, Gong signed an exclusive contract with Star Village Entertainment. She played Ji-won in Cho Hee-young's short film Two Waters and a Lighter alongside Moon Hye-in. Gong also portrayed Geum-hee, the third daughter, in Jeong Seung-oh's debut feature film Move the Grave, which expands on his short story When the Birds Come Back. The film combines dark humor and horror, depicting the story of five siblings and their elders in a dispute over relocating their father's grave. Move the Grave received widespread recognition, winning the CGV Arthouse Award at the Jeonju International Film Festival, the Grand Prize in the New Director Competition, the main prize in the 1-2 Competition, and the NETPAC Jury Award at the Warsaw International Film Festival. Gong's vibrant and captivating performances have established her as an acclaimed actress known for her talent and powerful on-screen presence.

That same year, Gong took on the role of Gong Jin-seon in Jang Hyun-sang's comical action-adventure film Zombie Crush: Heyri. Produced by GATE6, the story centers on the struggles of three musketeers—Jin-seon (Gong), Hyuna (Lee Min-ji), and Ga-yeon (Park So-jin) —as they attempt to save a village infected by a zombie virus. Gong received the Fantastic Best Actor Special Mention Award at the 24th Bucheon International Fantastic Film Festival for her performance.

Her next project, the drama Sweet Munchies is a romantic comedy written by Park Seung-hye and produced by Song Ji-won, where Gong played Yoo Sung-eun, a freelance broadcasting scriptwriter. She also appeared in the TV series Please Don't Date Him, both of which aired in November 2020.

On 17 November 2020, Indie Plus at the Seoul Cinema Center announced plans to host the "Rising Star - Actor Gong Min-jung Exhibition" from 19 to 23 November. The exhibition showcased a total of 14 works, including five feature films and seven short films divided into two sections, along with two personal recommendations from Gong. Featured films included Everyone Wants to Die by My Name (2012), Yourself and Yours (2016), Grass (2017), Kim Ji-young: Born 1982 (2019), Move the Grave (2019), Call Me If You Need Me (2018), Allergy (2015), Two Waters and a Lighter (2020), A Familiar Taste (2014), The Distance Between Us (2016), Coming-of-age (2018), and I Should Have Killed the Bastard (2018). Gong's recommendations included Blue Valentine (2010) and American Honey (2016).

=== 2021 to present: Mainstream popularity and accolades ===
In 2021, Gong portrayed Hee-soo in Jeong Gam-won's independent film The Train Passed By. Hee-soo embodies a woman who exists and does not exist simultaneously. As the protagonist, she embarks on a tranquil, solitary journey between the Daegu Dyeing Industrial Complex and a fishing village in Gangwon-do. Along the way, she briefly encounters various individuals, including her former lover, a grandmother with a broken radio, a middle-aged woman at a guesthouse, and a male student on a bicycle.

In May, Gong began filming the drama series Hometown Cha-Cha-Cha, remake of the 2004 film Mr. Handy, Mr. Hong, in Pohang. Gong achieved some success with the role of Pyo Mi-seon, a dental hygienist and the best friend of Shin Min-a's character, Yoon Hye-jin. Gong mentioned that she made an effort to fully immerse herself in the role. The atmosphere on set was so delightful that she would occasionally forget she was acting. When she was in Seoul, fans would recognize her on the streets and warmly greet her as "Unnie Mi-seon." Moreover, her parents requested her autograph for their acquaintances for the first time. Gong regards Hometown Cha-Cha-Cha as an endearing and fulfilling project.

In November, Gong made a return to independent film with the movie Sprinter. The film was screened at the 47th Seoul Independent Film Festival, which took place at CGV Art House Apgujeong and CGV Apgujeong from 25 November to 3 December. Prior to the screening, Gong participated in a press conference held at Art Nine in Sadang-dong on December 3rd alongside her co-actors from the film, Lim Ji-ho, Jeon Hwan-hwan, Song Deok-ho, Choi Jun-hyuk, and Choi Seung-yeon. On 29 November 2021, the Korea Independent Film Association announced a special exhibition titled "Isn't It Our Sphere?" at the Naver Indie Theater, scheduled to run from 29 November to 28 December 2021. The exhibition showcased five films featuring Gong, including Family Portrait and I Should Have Killed That Bastard, both directed by Kim Hye-jun. In that same month, her film Nothing Serious was released. For her role as Seon-bin, best friend of Jeon Jong-seo's character Ja-young, She was nominated in best supporting actress in 58th Grand Bell Awards.

In April 2022, Gong signed an exclusive contract with HB Entertainment. That year, she reunited with director Cho Hee-young for two consecutive projects: the short film The Owners, which screened at the Jeonju International Film Festival, and the feature-length indie film The Continuing Land. The latter received an invitation to the Seoul Independent Film Festival following its screening at the 28th Busan International Film Festival. It centers on Ho-rim, an international student in London who encounters various people after finding a camcorder on the street. In June 2022, Gong played Yook Min-jeong in the Just for Laugh! short omnibus project, specifically in the third sequence, Family Portrait directed by Kim Hyeon.

In 2022, Gong played a supporting role as Jang Ma-ri, a reporter at YBC news agency, in the tvN drama series Little Woman. This was followed by her performance as Na Ye-jin, a prosecutor with a high-end lifestyle, in One Dollar Lawyer, which earned her the Best Supporting Actress award at the 2022 SBS Drama Awards.

In 2023, Gong returned to indie film with Lee Rang's short film Thank You for Your Cinema, which depicts a conversation between two female indie film directors. She portrayed Director Gong Min-jeung, starring alongside Kim Sae-byeok. This project was the second campaign film of Indieplex Season 4 and was released simultaneously on 17 July on the Indieground and Marie Claire Korea YouTube channels.

In 2024, Gong portrayed Yang Joo-ran in the drama series Marry My Husband, where she is the assistant manager of U&K Food Marketing Team 1 and the assistant to Kang Ji-won (Park Min-young). Initially timid, her character undergoes significant transformation due to Ji-won's influence. Adapted by Shin Yoo-dam from a web novel and a webtoon of the same name, it achieved triple box office success, ranking first in average viewership among all tvN Monday-Tuesday dramas and topping domestic and global daily TV show rankings on TVING and Amazon Prime Video, respectively. As a result, Gong took her first reward vacation to Vietnam in March. In October 2024, she signed with a new agency, Fantagio.

== Personal life ==
While working on the set of Marry My Husband (2024), Gong met Jang Jae-ho, who portrayed Gong's character's husband. They married in September 2024 in a small ceremony. The following January, Gong gave birth to a girl.

== Filmography ==
Key
†	Denotes films that have not yet been released

=== Short film ===
List of acting performances in short film
Year	Title		Role	Note	Ref.
Year	English	Korean	Role	Note	Ref.
2009	A Perfect Sight	구경	Female		
2010	Please Please Me	날 놓아줘	Ji-ae		
2013	Jane, we know	월동준비	Female 2		
2014	A Familiar Taste	아빠의 맛	Hwang Kyung-eon		
2015	Saengilkeik	생일케익	Da-rae		
2015	Allergy	병구	Min-ji	Main role	
2015	Greed; Ghost Light	도깨비불	Wife		
2016	Terrific Weather	끝내 주는 날씨	Yeon-ju		
2016	Love Triangle	그 냄새는 소똥냄새였어	Min-ji		
2016	A Man in the Basement	지하의 남자	love girl		
2016	The Distance Between Us	윤리거리규칙	Choi Eun-jin (teacher)		
2016	Live Club Greyhound	라이브 하드	Jo Eun-jeong	Main role	
2017	Alone	의자 위 여자	Social Worker		
2018	A Room of One's Own	두 개의 방	Ja-hui		
2018	Coming of Age	성인식	Baek Seol	Main lead	
2018	I Should Have Killed that Bastard	그 새끼를 죽였어야 했는데	Movie production staff		
2019	Midday Picnic — Act 3: Call me if you need me	<한낮의 피크닉> 세 번째 에피소드 <내가 필요하면 전화해>의	Choi Yeong-sin		
2020	Two Waters and a Lighter	두 개의 물과 한 개의 라이터	Ji-won		
2020	Homework	귀를 기울이면	Min-jeong		
2020	The Girl Malsook	소녀 말숙	Mi-hyun		
2021	Just For Laughs! Segment: Family Portrait	우스운게 딱! 좋아!: 떨어져 있어야 가족이다	Yuk Min-jeong	Main role	
2022	Schrodinger's Deserted Island	평행관측은 6살부터	Mother	TVING short film	
2022	The Owners	주인들	Min-jeong		
2023	Thank You for Your Cinema	잘 봤다는 말 대신	Director Gong Min-jeung	Indieplex 4th Season	
TBA	Method Acting †	메소드연기	Director Lim		

=== Feature film ===
List of acting performances in feature films
Year	Title		Role	Note	Ref.
Year	English	Korean	Role	Note	Ref.
2011	Mama	마마	Emergency room nurse 1	Bit part	
2012	Your Time Is Up	누구나 제명에 죽고싶다	Park Jeong-jae	Supporting role	
2015	Sunshine	설지	Broadcast writer	Minor role	
2015	No Tomorrow	섬. 사라진 사람들	Township office employee	Minor role	
2015	Beauty Inside	뷰티 인사이드	Neurology resident	Minor role	
2015	Dog Eat Dog	개: Dog Eat Dog	Female reporter	Minor role	
2016	Yourself and Yours	당신자신과 당신의 것	So-yeon	Supporting role	
2017	On the Beach at Night Alone	밤의 해변에서 혼자	Ma-ri	Supporting role	
2018	Grass	풀잎들	Mi-na	Main role	
2018	The Vanished	사라진 밤	Hee-yeon	Supporting role	
2018	Live Hard	라이브 하드	Jo Eun-jeong	Main role (Feature film version of short film Live Club Greyhound)	
2019	I Am Home	집 이야기	Kyeong-ran	Supporting role	
2019	The Boy From Nowhere	파도를 걷는 소년		Voice appearance	
2019	Kim Ji-young: Born 1982	82년생 김지영	Kim Eun-young	Supporting role	
2019	Film Adventure	영화로운 나날	Director	Supporting role	
2020	Move the Grave	이장	Geum-hee	Main role	
2021	Zombie Crush In Heyri	좀비크러쉬: 헤이리	Gong Jin-seon	Main role	
2021	Kids Are Fine	아이들은 즐겁다	Teacher	Supporting role	
2021	Nothing Serious	연애 빠진 로맨스	Seon-bin	Supporting role	
2021	Ssanahee pure love	싸나희 순정	Hong A-ran (football coach)	Supporting role	
2021	The Train Passed by	희수	Hee-soo	Main role	
2022	Drown (Paroho)	파로호	Hyeon-ji (Detective)	Supporting role	
2022	How Have You Been	오랜만이다	Min-jeong	Supporting role	
2023	Sprinter	스프린터	Ji-hyun	Main role	
2023	Concrete Utopia	콘크리트 유토피아	Hyo-jin	Friendship appearance	
2024	The Continuing Land	이어지는 땅	Lee Won	Main role	

=== Television series ===
List of acting performances in television series
Year	Title		Role	Notes	Ref.
Year	English	Korean	Role	Notes	Ref.
2017	Temperature of Love	사랑의 온도	Soo-yeong		
2017	My Golden Life	황금빛 내 인생	Song Mi-heon		
2018	Familiar Wife	아는 와이프	Choi Hye-jeong		
2018	Drama Stage	문집	Shin So-i (adult)	one act-drama	
2020	My Holo Love	나 홀로 그대	Choi Seung-kwon		
2020	Sweet Munchies	야식남녀	Yoo Seong-eun		
2020–2021	Please Don't Date Him	제발 그 남자 만나지 마요	Tak Ki-hyun		
2021	Hometown Cha-Cha-Cha	갯마을 차차차	Pyo Mi-seon		
2022	Little Women	작은 아씨들	Jang Ma-ri		
2022	One Dollar Lawyer	천원짜리 변호사	Na Ye-jin		
2023	Daily Dose of Sunshine	정신병동에도 아침이 와요	Heo Ji-an		
2024	Marry My Husband	내 남편과 결혼해줘	Yang Joo-ran		
2024	Sorry Not Sorry	오늘도 지송합니다	Choi Ha-na		
2026	Boyfriend on Demand	월간남친	Yun Song		
2026	Reborn Rookie	신입사원 강회장	Gangwon-do governor's aide	Cameo (Episode 4)	

=== Web series ===
List of acting performances in web series
Year	Title		Role	Ref.
Year	English	Korean	Role	Ref.
2017	Green Fever	웹드라마 내일부터 우리는	Ma-ri	
2018	Top Management	탑 매니지먼트	JTBS employee	

== Stage ==
=== Hosting ===
List of hosting performances in film festivals
Year	Title	Notes	Ref.
2021	Opening ceremony of Indie Forum Film Festival 2021	with Ryu Kyung-soo	
2022	Closing ceremony of 48th Seoul Independent Film Festival	with Seo Hyun-woo	
2023	Closing ceremony of 49th Seoul Independent Film Festival	with Seo Hyun-woo	
2024	Opening ceremony of 26th Jeondongjin Independent Film Festival	with Ryu Kyung-soo	

=== Theater ===
List of acting performances in theater
Year	Title		Role	Theater	Date	Ref.
Year	English	Korean	Role	Theater	Date	Ref.
2011–2012	Rooftop Cat	옥탑방 고양이	Multi-girl	Sindorim Prime Art Hall	8 July – 29 January	
2012	Rooftop Cat	옥탑방 고양이	Multi-girl	BS Busan Bank Joeun Theater Hall 1	10 February – 11 March	
2012–2013	Rooftop Cat	옥탑방 고양이	Multi-girl	Gangnam Oriental Art Hall	2 March – 3 February	
2016	I am Getting Married in May	오월엔 결혼할꺼야	Eom Jeong-eun	Daehangno Sori Art Hall 1	8 March – 14 July	
2018	People of Justice	정의의 사람들	Dora (Governor-General's Wife)	Daehakro Dream Art Center Building 2	2–21 October	

== Awards and nominations ==
Name of the award ceremony, year presented, category, nominee of the award, and the result of the nomination
Award ceremony	Year	Category	Nominee / Work	Result	Ref.
Bucheon International Fantastic Film Festival	2021	Fantastic Best Actor Special Mention Award	Zombie Crush: Heyri	Won	
Grand Bell Awards	2022	Best Supporting Actress	Nothing Serious	Nominated	
SBS Drama Awards	2022	Best Supporting Actress in a Miniseries Romance/Comedy	One Dollar Lawyer	Won	
Seoul Global Movie Awards	2024	Best Acting Award in the Drama category	Daily Dose of Sunshine	Won	
