= Less Than Evil =

2018 South Korean television series

- Promotional poster
- Also known as: Luther
- Hangul: 나쁜 형사
- Hanja: 나쁜 刑事
- Lit.: Bad Detective
- RR: Nappeun hyeongsa
- MR: Nappŭn hyŏngsa
- Genre: Crime; Detective; Thriller
- Created by: Park Jae-beom (MBC Drama Operation Team)
- Based on: Luther by Neil Cross
- Written by: Heo Joon-woo; Kang Yi-hun
- Directed by: Kim Dae-jin
- Starring: Shin Ha-kyun; Lee Seol; Park Ho-san; Kim Gun-woo
- Country of origin: South Korea
- Original language: Korean
- No. of episodes: 32 (Note: In order to circumvent Korean laws that prevent commercial breaks in the middle of an episode, what would previously have been aired as single 70 minute episodes are now being repackaged as two 35 minute episodes, with two episodes being shown each night with a commercial break between the two.)

Production
- Executive producers: Teddy Jung; Kim Sang-young
- Producer: Yoo Hyun-jong
- Camera setup: Single-camera
- Running time: 35 minutes
- Production companies: MBC; iHQ
- Budget: ₩7.5 billion

Original release
- Network: MBC TV
- Release: December 3, 2018 – January 29, 2019

Related
- Klim (Russia)

Less Than Evil (Korean: 나쁜 형사; RR: Nappeun hyeongsa) is a 2018 South Korean television series based on the British series Luther. It stars Shin Ha-kyun, Lee Seol, Park Ho-san and Kim Gun-woo. It aired on MBC from December 3, 2018 to January 29, 2019.

== Synopsis ==
The drama centers on the ongoing psychological battle between a brilliant psychopathic murderer and a hot headed, justice-driven Detective Chief Inspector.

== Cast ==
=== Main ===
- Shin Ha-kyun as Woo Tae-suk

A tough and unscrupulous detective with the highest arrest rate, a character based on DCI John Luther.

- Lee Seol as Eun Sun-jae/Bae yeo-wool

A female psychopath based on antagonist Alice Morgan.

- Park Ho-san as Jeon Choon-man

A leading detective in the metropolitan area who is at odds with Woo Tae-suk

- Kim Gun-woo as Jang Hyung-min

A serial killer who pretends to be a prosecutor and Woo Tae-suk's greatest enemy based on serial killer Tom Marwood.

=== Supporting ===
- Cha Sun-woo as Chae Dong-yoon

A straight-as-an-arrow detective who graduated early from the police academy based on Luther's partner DS Justin Ripley.

- Bae Da-bin as Shin Ga-young

A prickly police officer based on DCI Erin Gray.

- Bae Yoo-ram as Ban Ji-deuk

An expert in IT programming who sets up her own detective agency based on DS Benny Silver.

- Yoon Hee-seok as Jo Doo-jin

The head of the PR department at the police station and Woo Tae-suk's best friend based on John Luther's best friend DCI Ian Reed.

- Yang Ki-won as Lee Moon-ki

A policeman on Woo Tae-suk's team

- Kim Na-yoon as Team Leader Sung

The head of forensic investigative team based on Luther's bosses DSU Rose Teller and DSU Martin Schnek.

- Hong Eun-hee as Kim Hae-joon

A lawyer and Woo Tae-suk's wife based on John Luther's wife Zoe Luther.

- Cho Yi-hyun as Bae Yeo-wool

A victim of a case that Woo Tae-suk cannot forget

- Bae Yoon-kyung as Woo Tae-hee

Woo Tae-suk's sister

- Ryu Tae-ho as Choi Jung-woo

A timid head detective who is indecisive. He works with Jeon Choon-man

- Kim Yi-kyung as Kwon Soo-ah

=== Special appearances ===
- Ahn Nae-sang as Commissioner general.

== Production ==
The actress Lee Seol was chosen among 300 others who auditioned for the role of Eun Sun-jae to play the female lead.

The first script reading was held in early September, 2018 with the attendance of cast and crew at the MBC in Sangam-dong.

== Original soundtrack ==
Less Than Evil OST

Soundtrack album by Various artists
- Released: 2018
- Genre: Soundtrack
- Languages: Korean; English
- Label: Blending

=== Part 1 ===
Released on December 3, 2018
No.	Title	Lyrics	Music	Artist	Length
1.	"Shadow" (그림자)	Kang Myeong-shin; Black Nine	ZigZag Note	Son Seung-yeon; Black Nine	3:46
2.	"Shadow" (Inst.)		ZigZag Note		3:46
Total length:					7:32

=== Part 2 ===
Released on December 11, 2018
No.	Title	Lyrics	Music	Artist	Length
1.	"Tattoo"	Shoulder Bully	Shoulder Bully; Kim Young-hwan	JK Kim Dong-wook	3:09
2.	"Tattoo" (Inst.)		Shoulder Bully; Kim Young-hwan		3:09
Total length:					6:18

=== Part 3 ===
Released on December 18, 2018
No.	Title	Lyrics	Music	Artist	Length
1.	"Regression" (회귀)	Surf Green	Surf Green	Surf Green (feat. Dong Ha)	4:18
2.	"Regression" (Inst.)		Surf Green		4:18
Total length:					8:36

== Ratings ==
- In this table, the blue numbers represent the lowest ratings and the red numbers represent the highest ratings.
- NR denotes that the drama did not rank in the top 20 daily programs on that date.
- N/A denotes that the rating is not known.

Ep.	Original broadcast date	Average audience share		
Ep.	Original broadcast date	AGB Nielsen		TNmS
Ep.	Original broadcast date	Nationwide	Seoul	Nationwide
1	December 3, 2018	7.1% (15th)	8.1% (9th)	6.5%
2	December 3, 2018	8.3% (9th)	9.2% (6th)	8.5%
3	December 4, 2018	8.6% (9th)	9.8% (6th)	8.2%
4	December 4, 2018	10.6% (6th)	11.5% (5th)	9.7%
5	December 10, 2018	7.4% (13th)	8.1% (9th)	6.9%
6	December 10, 2018	9.1% (9th)	10.0% (5th)	9.1%
7	December 11, 2018	7.3% (13th)	8.0% (8th)	6.2%
8	December 11, 2018	8.7% (6th)	9.5% (5th)	7.3%
9	December 17, 2018	7.1% (14th)	7.8% (11th)	6.2%
10	December 17, 2018	8.5% (9th)	9.4% (6th)	7.2%
11	December 18, 2018	7.6% (11th)	8.5% (8th)	6.6%
12	December 18, 2018	8.7% (7th)	9.6% (4th)	8.3%
13	December 24, 2018	6.6% (16th)	6.8% (16th)	6.1%
14	December 24, 2018	8.5% (9th)	8.9% (7th)	7.7%
15	December 25, 2018	7.0% (14th)	7.5% (13th)	6.5%
16	December 25, 2018	8.7% (8th)	9.4% (6th)	7.7%
17	January 7, 2019	5.4% (NR)	6.4% (15th)	4.8%
18	January 7, 2019	5.7% (19th)	6.4% (15th)	5.2%
19	January 8, 2019	5.7% (NR)	—N/a	5.4%
20	January 8, 2019	5.9% (NR)	6.5% (20th)	5.7%
21	January 14, 2019	5.6% (NR)	6.1% (20th)	4.7%
22	January 14, 2019	6.8% (15th)	7.8% (13th)	5.7%
23	January 15, 2019	5.6% (NR)	6.2% (20th)	—N/a
24	January 15, 2019	6.3% (17th)	6.9% (15th)	—N/a
25	January 21, 2019	5.4% (NR)	6.2% (18th)	4.4%
26	January 21, 2019	6.5% (17th)	7.1% (15th)	5.5%
27	January 22, 2019	3.9% (NR)	—N/a	3.6%
28	January 22, 2019	5.0% (17th)	5.3% (17th)	4.3%
29	January 28, 2019	5.7% (NR)	6.2% (19th)	4.8%
30	January 28, 2019	6.9% (13th)	7.3% (13th)	5.8%
31	January 29, 2019	5.7% (19th)	6.0% (15th)	—N/a
32	January 29, 2019	7.2% (11th)	7.7% (10th)	6.2%
Average		7.2%	— (Note: Due to some ratings not recorded, the exact average rating is unknown.)	—

== Awards and nominations ==
Year	Award	Category	Recipient	Result	Ref.
2018	37th MBC Drama Awards	Grand Prize (Daesang)	Shin Ha-kyun	Nominated	
2018	37th MBC Drama Awards	Drama of the Year	Less Than Evil	Nominated	
2018	37th MBC Drama Awards	Top Excellence Award, Actor in a Monday-Tuesday Miniseries	Shin Ha-kyun	Won	
2018	37th MBC Drama Awards	Excellence Award, Actor in a Monday-Tuesday Miniseries	Park Ho-san	Nominated	
2018	37th MBC Drama Awards	Excellence Award, Actress in a Monday-Tuesday Miniseries	Lee Seol	Nominated	
2018	37th MBC Drama Awards	Best New Actress	Lee Seol	Won	
2018	37th MBC Drama Awards	In Awe Award	Shin Ha-kyun	Won	
2019	55th Baeksang Arts Awards	Best New Actress	Lee Seol	Nominated	
