= Kim Gun-woo =

South Korean actor

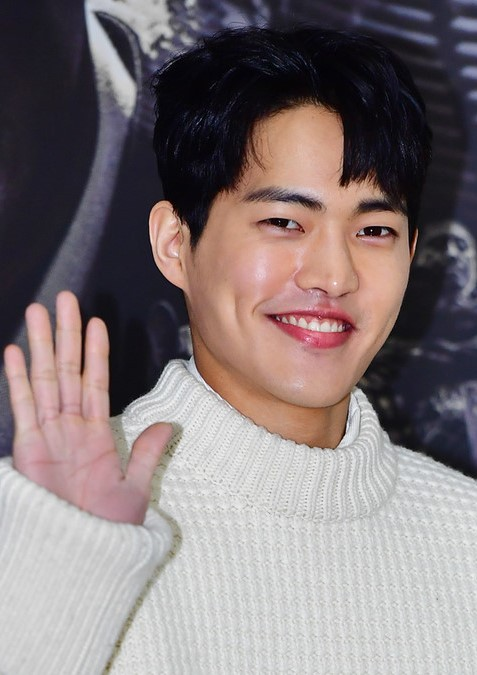
- Kim in 2019
- Born: 10 January 1992 (age 34); Seoul, South Korea
- Education: Korea National University of Arts
- Occupations: Actor; model
- Years active: 2016–present
- Agent: Blossom Entertainment
- Known for: Less Than Evil; Fight for My Way; The Glory

Korean name
- Hangul: 김건우
- RR: Gim Geonu
- MR: Kim Kŏnu

Kim Gun-woo (Korean: 김건우) is a South Korean actor and model. He is known for his roles in dramas such as Less Than Evil, Fight for My Way, Record of Youth, The Glory and You and Everything Else.

== Filmography ==
=== Film ===
Year	Title	Role	Ref.
2016	To Wool	Gun-woo	
2016	Bowlfish	Hong Seok-hyeon	
2022	The Ultimate Oppa	Jay	
2025	MOON's walking	Taeheon	

=== Television series ===
Year	Title	Role	Ref.
2017	Fight for My Way	Kim Tak-soo	
2018	Live	Kim Han-pyo	
2018	Less Than Evil	Jang Hyung-min	
2019	Catch the Ghost	Kim Hee-joon	
2020	Record of Youth	Park Do-ha	
2022	KBS Drama Special: "Let's Meet in an Unfamiliar Season"	Myung Ki-joon	

=== Web series ===
Year	Title	Role	Ref.
2022–2023	The Glory	Son Myeong-oh	
2025	You and Everything Else	Kim Sang-hak	

=== Television shows ===
Year	Title		Role	Notes	Ref.
Year	English	Korean	Role	Notes	Ref.
2023	My Little Old Boy	미운 우리 새끼	Cast member	Episodes 338, 341–342, 345–347, 354–355, 358-359	

== Theatre ==
Year	Title	Korean Title	Role	Ref.
2023	Paris Bakery	빠리빵집	Voice Actor	
2023	Those Days	그날들	Kang Moo-young	

== Awards and nominations ==
Name of the award ceremony, year presented, category, nominee of the award, and the result of the nomination
Award ceremony	Year	Category	Nominee / Work	Result	Ref.
Baeksang Arts Awards	2023	Best New Actor – Television	The Glory	Nominated	
Baeksang Arts Awards	2026	Best Supporting Actor – Television	You and Everything Else	Nominated	
KBS Drama Awards	2022	Best Actor in Drama Special/TV Cinema	The Stranger	Nominated	
SBS Entertainment Awards	2023	Rising Star Award	My Little Old Boy	Won	
