= Seoul Independent Film Festival =

Film festival in Seoul, South Korea

- Official poster
- Opening film: Cenozoic Life by Lim Jeong-hwan
- Location: CGV Arthouse, Seoul, South Korea
- Founded: 1975
- Most recent: 2023
- Awards: Grand Feature Prize: 'Monster by Lee Jeong-hong
- Hosted by: The Association of Korean Independent Film & Video; Korean Film Council
- No. of films: 130
- Festival date: November 30 to December 8, 2023
- Language: International
- Website: 2023

Current: 49th Seoul Independent Film Festival
- 50th 48th

Seoul Independent Film Festival (서울獨立映畵祭, 서울독립영화제, SIFF) is an independent film festival in Republic of Korea. The Seoul Independent Movie Festival is jointly held by the Korean Film Council and the Association of Korean Independent Film & Video. Every winter, this festival is held in Seoul. This film festival hosted by Korean Film Council was started as Korean Youth Film Festival in 1975.

The 47th Seoul Independent Film Festival was held from November 25 to December 3, 2021. A total number of 1550 films were submitted for the festival. From this festival a new award 'CGK Award' supported by the 'Korean Cinematographer's Guild' is being started, and the Audience Award, which was canceled last year, is being revived.

The 48th Seoul Independent Film Festival was held from December 1 to December 9, 2022. A total number of 1574 films were submitted for the festival. 127 films including the opening film The Wind Blows Again by Kim Tae-il and Joo Joo-mi were screened. The opening ceremony was hosted by Kwon Hae-hyo, and Gong Min-jeung and Seo Hyun-woo closed the festival.

== History ==
Festival's name had changed to Film Festival of Golden Crown Awards in 1989. It became a Short Film Festival of Golden Crown Awards in 1994, then changed its name to Korean Youth Short Film Awards in 1998. In 1999, it was transformed into Independent Film Festival Competition, Korean Independent Short Film Festival, after Korean Film Council was established. From 2002, Korean Independent Film Association cosponsored this festival and the film festival's name was changed to Seoul Independent Film Festival. Korean Independent Film Council has organized this film festival from 2010.

The festival features a national independent film competition and gives awards regardless of theme, type, and length throughout varied genres including plays, experiential documentaries, and animated films. Also, the individual invitation program plans to introduce a variety of trends regarding independent movies. Contemporary indie film makers will gather up to envision a movie reflecting the spirit of the age and to find a good alternative to the existing films.

The Seoul Independent Movie Festival runs on a daily basis, which has been constantly expanded to distributing channels for Independent films. The business aims to offer practical and realistic support for pre-production, distribution, and marketing in order to nurture the best independent film talent.

== Organization ==
Korean Independent Film Council has hosted Seoul Independent Film Festival. And the festival's supervision is an executive committee of Seoul Independent Film Festival.

== Purpose ==
Seoul Independent Film Festival has 5 purposes. First, it assesses independent films made during a year and suggests a new vision. Second, it induces qualitative improvement of independent films. And, it attempts to meet with audience actively. Also, it arranges a place that encourage new attempt and challenge of independent film. Lastly, it inspires creative consciousness introducing foreign independent film.

== Character ==
It is competition film festival for all genres of Korean independent films. It invites public participation and presents awards without distinction of genre or time. Also it announces diverse experiences of independent films through the separate invitation section.

== Program ==
Screening program of Seoul independent film festival is composed of three parts that are domestic competitive section, domestic invitation of the section and foreign invitation of the section. Each section is composed of a full-length film or a short film by standard of 1hour.

There is 3 parts of program. It is a Domestic part in the competition. It is a work that selected by the preliminaries commission through contest. Another is a Domestic part in the invitation. It is a Korean work that planned and invited by Seoul Independent Film Festival. The other part is a Foreign part in the invitation. It is a Foreign work that planned and invited by Seoul Independent Film Festival.

== Award ==
The festival has 2 sorts of award. One is the Main Prize. The other is a Special Prize.

=== Main Prize ===
Main Prize has 4 types of prize. The Grand Prize is selecting to Grand prize work in competition and award cash prize, plaque. Next, the Best Picture Award is a selecting to Grand prize work in competition and award cash prize, plaque. And the Excellent picture award is selecting to superb work in competition and award cash prize, plaque. Last, the Independent Star Award is selecting to two parts, actors and staffs, in competition and award cash prize, plaque.

=== Special Prize ===
Special Prize has 2 types of prize. The Audience award is presenting to work that receive favorable comment by audience's vote and award cash prize, plaque. And, Self-righteous man award is selected by Korean Independent Film Association's operating committee and award cash prize, plaque.

=== Awards ===
Final Feature Competition
Grand Prize: A prize of ₩20 million and a plaque are awarded to the grand prize film.
Best Picture Award: ₩15 million in prize money and a plaque are awarded to the best film.
Final Short Competition
Grand Prize: A prize of ₩10 million and a plaque are awarded to the grand prize film.
Best Short Film Award: ₩7 million in prize money and a plaque are awarded to the best film.
Best Short Film Award: ₩5 million in prize money and a plaque are awarded to the best films.
New selection section
New choice: A prize of ₩7 million and a plaque is awarded to selected works from among the screenings in the new selection category.
New perspective: A prize of ₩3 million and a plaque is awarded among the films screened in the new selection category.
Special prize
Independent Star Award: In the final competition, one actor from each of the feature films and short films is selected and awarded with a prize money of ₩2 million and a plaque.
Passionate Staff Award: One of the staff who participated in the screening of the feature film in the final competition will be selected and awarded ₩2 million in prize money and a plaque.
CGK Cinematography Award
Chief Directors Guild Award: A prize of ₩3 million and a plaque are awarded to one of the filming staff who participated in the screening of the feature film and short films in the final competition.
Solitary General Award(G)
The Korea Independent Film Association Steering Committee selects from among the final competition categories and awards ₩2 million in prize money and a plaque.
Executive Committee Special Award
The Seoul Independent Film Festival 2021 executive committee selects from among the participants of all screened films and award ₩3 million in prize money and a plaque.
Audience Award
Among all screened films, a prize of ₩1 million and a plaque is awarded to the feature films and short films that received the highest acclaim through audience votes.

== Distribution of work ==
There are 3 distribution ways of work. First is a 'Circular screening(indie picnic)'. Prize-winning works and showing works are screened at tour showing with Seoul Independent Film Festival's local network. Next is an 'Online screening'. Prize-winning works and showing works are screened at online showing, planned by Seoul Independent Film Festival. The last is a 'DVD production'. A work which selected from prize-winning works and showing works will sale planning DVD.

== Organisation of festival ==
=== 2021 - present ===
- The 47th Seoul Independent Film Festival (2021)

November 26 - December 3, 2021
Festival Venues: CGV Art House Apgujeong, CGV Apgujeong
Host: Korea Independent Film Association, Film Promotion Committee
Characteristic: It is a domestic competitive independent film festival that encompasses and re-examines various independent films made during the year.
Slogan 2021: Back to Back, back to back, moving forward
Opening ceremony MC: Kwon Hae-hyo and Ryu Si-hyeon
Closing ceremony hosted by Seo Hyun-woo and Lee Sang-hee
Films screened:1550 films
Opening Film: Sprinter (Choi Jeong-yeon, South Korea)
Awardees:
Final Feature Competition
Grand Prize: From Home, To Home by Hye-won Ji
Best Picture Award: Hot Day and Cold Night by director Park Song-yeol
Final Short Competition
Grand Prize:Cut and Paste by Kim Hyo-joon
Best Short Film Award: City Bag by Hwang Seon-young
Best Short Film Award: Barrens by Lee Tak
New selection section
New choice: The Corner by Shinseon
New Perspective Award: Survival Tactics by Park Geun-young
Independent Star Award: Lim Seon-woo and Jo Min-kyung of Severance Pay and Two Women Wearing the Same Underwear
Passionate Staff Award: Chosun Hong for the sound design of Melting Ice Cream
CGK Cinematography Award
Kim Woo-young of The Barrens
Executive Committee's Special Award: Yang Young-hee for Soup and Ideology

2022

- The 48th Seoul Independent Film Festival (2022)

December 1 — December 9, 2022
Festival Venues: CGV Art House Apgujeong, CGV Apgujeong
Host: Korea Independent Film Association, Film Promotion Committee
Characteristic: It is a domestic competitive independent film festival that encompasses and re-examines various independent films made during the year.
Slogan 2022: The Art of Love
Opening ceremony MC: Kwon Hae-hyo
Closing ceremony hosted by Gong Min-jung and Seo Hyun-woo
Films screened:127 films
Opening Film: The Wind Blows Again (Kim Tae-il and Joo Joo-mi, South Korea)
Awardees:
Final Feature Competition
Grand Prize: Monster by Lee Jeong-hong
Best Picture Award: The Fifth Thoracic Vertebra by director Park Se-young
Final Short Competition
Grand Prize:Reparation by Yang Jae-joon
Best Short Film Award: Engraving by Kim Min-kyung
Best Short Film Award: A Cup of Tea with Mr. Park Young-gil by Yoo Woo-il
New selection section
New choice: 'Two People by Ban Park Ji-eun
New Perspective Award: Groping the Elephant's Hind Legs by Kim Nam-seok
New Choice Award special mention: Mother's Land by Park Jae-beom
Independent Star Award: Sohn Soo-hyun and Ki-yoon of Heomchan Grows Up and Archaeology of Love
Passionate Staff Award: Lee Jin-geun for the cinematographer of Connecting Land
CGK Cinematography Award
Kim Lee Jin-geun of The Land of Continuing
Executive Committee's Special Award: Travel Lee Ha-ram and Little Garden by Lee Mario
General Award: Archaeology of Love by Lee Wan-Min
Audience Award: Sura by Hwang Yoon and Seoul Theater by Kim Tae-yang

2023

- The 49th Seoul Independent Film Festival (2023)

November 30 — December 8, 2023
Slogan 2023: Dear Life
Opening Film: Cenozoic Life (Lim Jeong-hwan, South Korea)

== See also ==
- Busan International Film Festival
