= Seoul Busters =

2024 South Korean television series

- Promotional poster
- Hangul: 강매강
- RR: Gangmaegang
- MR: Kangmaegang
- Genre: Crime comedy
- Written by: Lee Young-chul; Lee Kwang-jae
- Directed by: Ahn Jong-yeon; Shin Joong-hoon
- Starring: Kim Dong-wook; Park Ji-hwan; Seo Hyun-woo; Park Se-wan; Lee Seung-woo
- Country of origin: South Korea
- Original language: Korean
- No. of episodes: 20

Production
- Producers: Park Sun-ah; Kim Gyung-kook; Kwon Jong-duk
- Running time: 45 minutes
- Production companies: Studio S; BA Entertainment; Chorokbaem Media

Original release
- Network: Disney+
- Release: September 11 – October 30, 2024

Seoul Busters (Korean: 강매강) is a 2024 South Korean crime comedy television series co-written by Lee Young-chul and Lee Gwang-jae, co-directed by Ahn Jong-yeon and Shin Joong-hoon, and starring Kim Dong-wook, Park Ji-hwan, Seo Hyun-woo, Park Se-wan, and Lee Seung-woo. It was released on Disney+ from September 11, to October 30, 2024.

== Synopsis ==
It depicts the story of the nation's last-ranked powerful squad in the county and the elite Violent Crime Team leader and meet to become the best team.

== Cast and characters ==
=== Main ===
- Kim Dong-wook as Dongbang Yu-bin

The new leader of Violent Crime Team 2 at Songwon Police Station, which has the dishonorable title of being lowest in the country in terms of arrest performance. He is an elite police officer with a brilliant mind, good looks, excellent athleticism, and overwhelming academic background, but he is also known for his unpredictable behavior patterns and a sense of humor as well as his brilliant reasoning skills.

- Park Ji-hwan as Mu Jung-ryeok

A veteran detective of Violent Crime Team 2 at Songwon Police Station. He is a former national boxing team member and a sharp-tongued detective with an indescribable fatal charm despite his bandit-like appearance.

- Seo Hyun-woo as Jeong Jeong-hwan

A life-style detective of Violent Crime Team 2 at Songwon Police Station. He is a former national shooting team member who dreamed of winning multiple Olympic titles but ended up becoming the king of mountains, is a farting expert who risks his life for promotion in order to support his wife and four children.

- Park Se-wan as Seo Min-seo

A hongiljeom (Note: 홍일점; lit. 'one red dot' means the only girl in a group of guys.) detective of Violent Crime Team 2 at Songwon Police Station. Despite her dapper appearance, she has an easy-going but down-to-earth personality, and with her unhesitatingly honest tongue and strong inner self, she is practically number one in the team.

- Lee Seung-woo as Jang Tan-sik

The youngest member of Violent Crime Team 2 at Songwon Police Station. He is a likable youngster who is full of mistakes that make him sound like a "long sigh" (as his name suggests), but he makes up for it with his flawless ice-buying skills and overflowing enthusiasm. He hides from everyone that his grandmother is a chaebol and he is her heir.

=== Supporting ===
- Son Eun-seo as Jang Eun-kyeong

The head of the forensic team at the National Forensic Science Laboratory, who is in charge of most of the crime scenes. She is an empathetic and caring person who was originally an ordinary pediatrician, but after seeing her young patient unintentionally become a victim of a child abuse crime, she returned to study forensic medicine.

- Choi Kwang-il as a chief of police
- Park Hyung-soo as Special investigation leader

== Production ==
=== Development ===
The series was developed under the working title Not Powerful but Attractive Violent Crime Unit, and both penned by Lee Young-cheol and Lee Kwang-jae of MBC's High Kick!, High Kick Through the Roof, High Kick: Revenge of the Short Legged, tvN's Potato Star 2013QR3, and TV Chosun's Smashing on Your Back. BA Entertainment, Chorokbaem Media, and Studio S managed the production.

It was reported that the series was being discussed to be a Disney+ original instead. In May 2024, Disney+ confirmed and shared its broadcast plan for the series.

=== Casting ===
Kim Dong-wook, Park Ji-hwan, Seo Hyun-woo, Park Se-wan was cast for the series. Kim, Park, Seo, Park together with Lee Seung-woo were confirmed to play the main roles of the series.

=== Filming ===
Principal photography began at the end of October 2023.

== Release ==
The series was scheduled to air in 2024 as part of SBS' Friday–Saturday lineup. According to broadcasting official, the series was supposed to be broadcast in May 2024, but suffered from frequent programming changes and a suggestion to change it as a Disney+ original was discussed.

Disney+ confirmed that Seoul Busters was scheduled to be released on September 11, 2024.
