= Charles Dorfman =

British film producer, director and screenwriter

Charles Dorfman is a British film producer, director and screenwriter.

He is the son of Lloyd Dorfman. He was educated at St Paul's School, London.

In 2021, he was the writer, director and a producer of Barbarians.
