= Evil Come, Evil Go =

- Film poster
- Directed by: Walt Davis
- Written by: Walt Davis
- Story by: Bob Chinn
- Produced by: Bob Chinn
- Starring: Cleo O'Hara; Jane Tsentas; Sandra Henderson
- Cinematography: Manuel Conde
- Edited by: M. Samaniego
- Music by: Dan Goodman
- Production company: Chinn-Adrian Productions
- Distributed by: Manuel S. Conde Distribution
- Release date: 1972 (United States)
- Running time: 73 minutes
- Country: United States
- Language: English

Evil Come, Evil Go is a 1972 softcore pornographic horror film written and directed by Walt Davis.

== Plot ==
"Sister" Sarah Jane Butler, a hymn-humming religious fanatic who believes God has chosen her to cleanse the world of those who have sex for pleasure, seduces a bar patron, and guts him after the two leave together. Sarah then drives to Los Angeles, and lures another man to his death, scrawling "God is Love, not Sex" on a mirror afterward. While busking and preaching on the street, Sarah befriends Penelope von Prut, a naive lesbian who is being supported by her wealthy and ashamed parents. Sarah moves in with Penny, who she takes on as a disciple, and inducts into "Sister Sarah's Sacred Order of the Sisters of Complete Subjugation" by tying her to a bed, stripping her, and teasing her with a knife as they sing "Glory, Glory, Hallelujah".

Sarah and Penny sing in the streets, make plans to create a television series that Sarah will use as a platform for her views, and intimidate Penny's tenants. Sarah has Penny lure a man home, and as he and Penny have sex, Sarah stabs him to death. Penny is horrified by the murder, but continues to obey Sarah. As Sarah and Penny prepare to dispose of the man's body, Penny's ex-girlfriend Junie visits, and becomes another victim when Sarah garrotes her with a scarf as she is having sex with Penny. Sarah and Penny dump their victims in the woods, where they spot a couple having sex. After the woman leaves, the man approaches Sarah and Penny, and after chatting with them, leaves with the duo, who will presumably kill him as well. A guitarist who had appeared throughout the film follows the group from afar, and sings "Evil Come, Evil Go" as the credits roll.

== Cast ==
- Cleo O'Hara as Sarah Jane Butler
- Sandra Henderson as Penelope von Prut
- Jane Tsentas as Junie
- Rick Cassidy as Morgan
- Margot Devletian as Rita
- Chesley Noone as Albert
- Gerard Broulard as Man in Woods
- Jacqueline Lissette as Woman in Woods
- Norman Fields as Michael
- Roy Hankey as Waiter at Bip's
- Vickie Cristal as Lady with the Dog
- Doris Jung as Female Lover
- Marc Wurzel as Male Lover
- Jesse Dizon as Pool Player
- John Holmes as Pool Player
- Walt Davis as Arizona Pig Farmer
- Bob Chinn as Bar Patron in White Shirt

== Reception ==
Bill Gibron of DVD Verdict wrote "Wildly uneven, funny as Hell and occasional as disturbed as an actual psychopath, Evil Come Evil Go joins the ranks of other ridiculous exploitation romps, trying to hide their carnality with nonsensical narrative misdirection. And it kind of works." Daily Grindhouse's Paul Freitag-Fey called the film "a bizarre blend of ugly sex and ugly gore" that was nonetheless "a genuinely fascinating piece of work" due primarily to Cleo O'Hara's over-the-top performance. O'Hara's performance was also praised by Ian Jane of Rock! Shock! Pop!, who stated "Throw in an inexplicable guitar player who seems to pop up at random and serenade Sarah, a few great scenes where O'Hara’s crazed preacher interrupts a few couples in the midst of coitus and some great footage capturing the seedier side of early seventies Hollywood and it's easy to see why this one would have the cult following that it does."
