= Barbarians (2021 film) =

British horror film

- Theatrical poster
- Directed by: Charles Dorfman
- Written by: Charles Dorfman
- Produced by: Jason Newmark; Laurie Cook; Charles Dorfman
- Starring: Iwan Rheon; Tom Cullen; Catalina Sandino Moreno; Inés Spiridonov; Will Kemp; Connor Swindells; Tommy McDonnell; Kevin Ryan
- Cinematography: Charlie Herranz
- Edited by: Tommy Boulding
- Music by: Marc Canham
- Distributed by: Blue Finch Film Releasing
- Release date: 28 September 2021 (Fantastic Film Festival)
- Running time: 90 minutes
- Country: United Kingdom
- Language: English
- Box office: $10,742

Barbarians is a 2021 horror film written and directed by Charles Dorfman and starring Iwan Rheon, Tom Cullen, Catalina Sandino Moreno, and Inès Spiridonov. It follows a group of four at a dinner party which is derailed by masked invaders.

== Plot ==
A video is shown advertising a property called the "Gateway" property, named after the nearby Gaeta stone – known as a sacred site to historical druids.

Going on a morning jog on his birthday, Adam, the current leaseholder of Gateway, comes across a wounded fox snared in barbed wire. He attempts to free the fox, but backs off when the animal hisses at him before resuming his jog. Returning home some time later while his girlfriend Eva works on a large replica Gaeta stone in the property courtyard, Adam discovers the dying fox in his kitchen. Eva and worker Dan come inside and, after expressing horror at the sight of the animal, Dan quickly euthanizes it.

Meanwhile, Lucas (the owner of Gateway and presenter of the advertisement) and his girlfriend Chloe drive to the Gateway property to celebrate Adam's birthday. While on the way, they stop at the Gaeta stone as a neopagan celebration takes place. While there, Lucas is attacked by a celebrant while recording a video lamenting the death of Alan Wickes, his former partner.

Lucas and Chloe arrive at the property, and Eva takes Chloe to her art studio after learning of the latter's interest. Eva remarks that her largely dark and disturbing art has been focused towards pagan imagery since her move to Gateway. At the same time, Lucas gifts Adam a mysterious drug contained in an eye dropper. Later during dinner, Chloe admits to being pregnant. After she goes to the bathroom, Adam confronts her with worries that the child could be his. They return to dinner, and Adam spikes Lucas's drink with the drug in revenge for Lucas's taunting behavior. Lucas attempts to renegotiate the sale of the property, and a fight breaks out between him and Adam. Adam reveals his prior affair with Chloe as the doorbell rings. Eva opens the door to reveal two assailants in animal masks.

The invaders take Adam, Lucas, and Eva hostage while Chloe drives off, but is run off the road by another masked individual who takes her hostage with the rest of the group. The bird-masked invader, seemingly the leader of the group, performatively vandalizes the house before seating Lucas in a chair and dousing him in blood. Lucas is forced to read a confession letter in the style of his advertisement for Gateway, but shortly after begins to suffer from a bad trip and is able to break free from his restraints, killing the bird-masked invader. One invader chases Lucas outside while the other is overpowered and is revealed to be Dan. Lucas is overpowered and killed by his assailant Neil, who reveals that the invaders are the sons of Alan Wickes, and that they blame Lucas for their father's death and the loss of their family property.

Adam convinces the two invaders that he will sign the property to them. A conflict ensues in which Chloe stabs Dan who shoots her in retaliation, killing her. Eva and Neil fight before Adam tackles him out of a window, seemingly killing them both. Eva pursues Dan but is unable to bring herself to kill him. Adam is revealed to be alive, and decisively kills Dan with a captive bolt pistol before embracing with Eva.

== Cast ==
- Iwan Rheon as Adam
- Catalina Sandino Moreno as Eva
- Tom Cullen as Lucas
- Inès Spiridonov as Chloe
- Connor Swindells as Dan
- Tommy McDonnell as Neil
- Will Kemp as John

== Production ==
The vast majority of the film was filmed at a single house in rural England. Writer and director Charles Dorfman stated that he started the film as "a project he could film in his flat", and that while writing the film he was interested in exploring "The masks we wear socially... and who we are when they come off".

== Release ==
Barbarians premiered during the Fantastic Film Festival on September 28, 2021, and was released in theaters and on-demand on April 1, 2022, by IFC Midnight. The film was also shown during the FrightFest film Festival's 2021 Halloween event.

== Reception ==
=== Box office ===
In its opening weekend, the film earned $7,538 from 41 theaters, for a per screen average of $183. In its second weekend it dropped to 10 theaters, earning a further $287. Eventually the film attained total box office earnings of $10,742.

=== Critical response ===
On review aggregator Rotten Tomatoes, Barbarians holds an approval rating of 56% based on 50 reviews, with an average rating of 5.8/10. The site's critics consensus reads, "Sporadically suspenseful, Barbarians is too tonally indecisive to consistently make its most important points". Metacritic gives the film a weighted average score of 57 out of 100, based on 11 critics, indicating "mixed or average reviews".

James Berardinelli of ReelViews left a largely positive review, stating "Dorfman's venture into this familiar milieu is sufficiently well-made to make it worth the time. And, unlike too many recent thrillers, it doesn't overstay its welcome", however he noted "... the characters and their relationships are ill-formed. We get bits and pieces during the first half but much is unrevealed". Noel Murray of Los Angeles Times wrote "... although Barbarians doesn't have much new to add to the home-invasion genre or much new to say about rich bullies who make even their friends miserable, it really connects for a good, long stretch at the start". Critic Glenn Kenny writing for RogerEbert.com gave a mixed review, stating "The director carries out his ultimately banal aims with commendable dispatch... But as an individual who's not likely to have his dream house handed to him anytime soon under any circumstances, shady or not, I couldn't relate".
