= The Vanished (2018 film) =

2018 film by Lee Chang-hee

- Theatrical release poster
- Hangul: 사라진 밤
- Lit.: Vanished Night
- RR: Sarajin bam
- MR: Sarajin pam
- Directed by: Lee Chang-hee
- Screenplay by: Lee Hee-chan; Lee Chang-hee
- Based on: The Body, directed by Oriol Paulo
- Produced by: Kim Young-min; Kim You-kyung
- Starring: Kim Sang-kyung; Kim Kang-woo; Kim Hee-ae
- Cinematography: Lee Jong-yeol
- Edited by: Kim Woo-il
- Music by: Park Weil
- Production companies: Sidus Corporation; MCMC; Double & Joy Pictures
- Distributed by: Kidari Ent
- Release date: March 7, 2018
- Running time: 101 minutes
- Country: South Korea
- Language: Korean
- Box office: US$10 million

The Vanished (Korean: 사라진 밤) is a 2018 South Korean psychological thriller film directed by Lee Chang-hee, starring Kim Sang-kyung, Kim Kang-woo and Kim Hee-ae. It is a remake of the 2012 Spanish film The Body, directed by Oriol Paulo.

== Plot ==
Yoon Seol-hee, a famous married chaebol, recently died. On the day of her funeral, her body was mysteriously stolen. Detective Jung-sik investigated the case and requested the presence of Seol-hee's husband, professor Park Jin-han. Before the meet up with Jin-han, it turned out that Jin-han had had a secret affair with a student, whom he rushed to right after the funeral to find comfort.

At the police station, a series of bizarre events led Jin-han to believe that his wife was still alive. It was revealed that Jin-han, a long time ago, had spent time to study a new form of drug, which later turned out to be toxic to the body. This drug could paralyse the nervous system and cause death leaving no evidence behind. Jin-han, discussed with his mistress Hye -jin, attempted to poison Seol-hee so they could be together. There was one small hole in his plot, to which Jin-han trusted that it led to the failure of the plan, was the effect of the toxic could be blocked by the use of illicit drugs.

Afraid that his might-still-be-alive wife could harm Hye-jin, Jin-han spit out the truth of his relationship with Hye-jin. However, more and more evidence shows the connection of Jin-han to his wife's death, which led detective Jung-sik to believe that Jin-han poisoned his wife and stole the body to interfere with the examination of the body. Despite the furious Chief, Jin-Han persisted to search for the missing body. More questions led back to the so-called lying Jin-han, as the police found the place which he claimed to be the house of his mistress Hye-jin and found nothing but an empty house. They assumed Jin-han was buying more time around so he could get rid of the body. Meanwhile, Jin-han got more nervous as he knew what his wife could do.

Jin-han kept getting messages from the number of dead Seol-hee, telling him to go to the place where they "had their secret" together. After being released from the police station, Jin-han rushed to an isolated house of his possess and made his way into the forest nearby. He then bumped into detective Jung-sik who had been following him. From this point, mysteries started to be unfolded.

Years ago, detective Jung-sik was soon to be a married man. However, his wife died in a car accident and her body had disappeared since. Her little sister remembered nothing but a logo from the car, which Jung-sik could use to trace back to the company which Jin-han and his wife owned. From there, Jung-sik began to plot his revenge with the help of Hye-jin, who turned out to be his girlfriend's sister. Jung-sik himself stole the body of Seol-hee and left hints behind to which Jin-han, out of guilt, imaginarily matched them with the doing of Seol-hee. At the end, Jung-sik achieved his purpose: Finding the body of his late girlfriend and successfully framed Jin-han into murdering and stealing Seol-hee's body. The film ended with Jung-sik and Hye- jin driving far away.

== Cast ==
- Kim Sang-kyung as Woo Jung-sik
- Kim Kang-woo as Park Jin-han
- Kim Hee-ae as Yoon Seol-hee
- Han Ji-an as Hye-jin
- Lee Ji-hoon as Seok-won
- Seo Hyun-woo as Dong-gu
- Lee Min-ji as Sook-kyung
- Kwon Hae-hyo as Police chief (special appearance)
- Kim Ji-young as Doctor Cha (special appearance)
- Kyung Soo-jin as Ji-young (special appearance)
- Ryu Kyung-soo as Repair team 2
- Gong Min-jeung as Hee-yeon

== Production ==
Principal photography began on June 12, 2017.

== Reception ==
Released on March 7, 2018, The Vanished opened in first place in South Korea, earning $411,278 from 696 screens. Over the next four days, the film continued to top the local box office, where it made US$$5.09 million from 654,000 admissions in its first weekend.

During the second weekend since the film was released, it attracted 251,824 moviegoers and was placed second at the weekend box office, accumulating the total audiences to 1.11 million.
