= Lee Bong-ryun =

South Korean actress (born 1981)

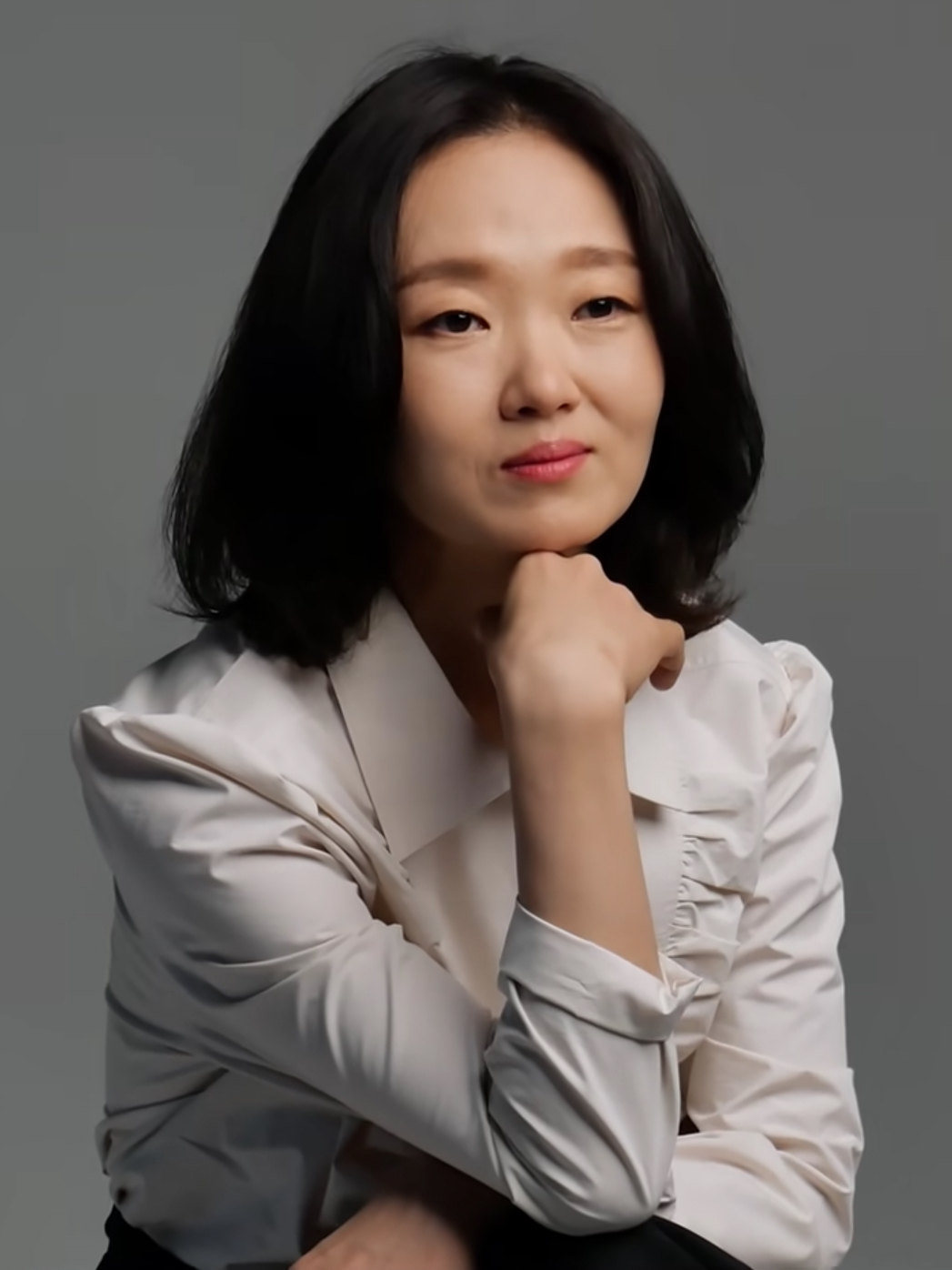
- Lee in June 2021
- Born: Lee Jeong-eun; February 7, 1981 (age 45); Pohang, South Korea
- Other name: Lee Bong-ryeon
- Education: Daegu Arts University; Chung-Ang University (MA)
- Occupation: Actress
- Years active: 2005–present
- Agent: AM Entertainment
- Spouse: Lee Gyu-hoe (m. 2019)

Korean name
- Hangul: 이정은
- RR: I Jeongeun
- MR: I Chŏngŭn

Stage name
- Hangul: 이봉련
- Hanja: 李鳳輦
- RR: I Bongryeon
- MR: I Pongnyŏn

Lee Jeong-eun (Korean: 이정은; born February 7, 1981), better known by the stage name Lee Bong-ryun (Korean: 이봉련), is a South Korean character actress. In 2020, Lee was cast as Princess Hamlet in the gender-blind production of Shakespeare's Hamlet for the 70th anniversary of National Theater Company of Korea. For this role, she won the 57th Baeksang Arts Awards for Best Actress in a Play. She is also frequently cast in other notable productions by the National Theater Company of Korea.

Lee started her career on stage in 2005 in Daehangno, performing in plays and musicals. Since 2012, she has appeared in supporting roles in various films and television dramas. Her notable screen works includes the films Burning, Exit, and Kim Ji-young, Born 1982, as well as the series Hometown Cha-Cha-Cha, Crash Course in Romance, and Resident Playbook.

== Early life ==
Lee Bong-ryun was born Lee Jeong-eun on February 7, 1981, in Pohang, North Gyeongsang Province, South Korea. Her father was an employee at Pohang Steelworks. After attending high school in Pohang for one month, she withdrew at age sixteen and relocated to Daegu. There, she completed an eight-month course at an academy before passing the General Educational Development (GED) equivalency exam.

At age 17, Lee enrolled in Daegu Arts University to study photography. She later earned a master's degree in photography from Chung-Ang University in Seoul, completing her studies at age 24. During her career as a photographer, she used the pseudonym Zhuge Bong-ryeon for her exhibitions.

== Career ==
=== Beginning ===
Lee's transition from photography to the performing arts began with a role in a short film directed by a colleague who had transferred from photography to film studies. In 2003, after watching a production of the musical Singin' in the Rain, Lee was inspired by the performance of actor Park Dong-ha. This prompted her to enroll in the musical department of a social education center at a nearby university, where she attended night classes for two years. During this period, her instructor and stage director, Kim Dong-yeon, appointed her as the assistant director for his play Fantasy Fairy Tale.

In 2005, Lee made her professional acting debut in the musical Five Drawings of Love. Originally cast as an understudy, she performed the role for one month due to the absence of a lead actor. Following her debut, she appeared in a wide range of stage productions, establishing a foundation in both plays and musicals.

In 2008, Lee auditioned for the musical Laundry after seeing Lee Jung-eun's portray the role of the grandmother. She successfully secured the part for the following season and remained with the production for three years. During this time, Lee participated in several other stage works, including Roberto Zucco, directed by Oh Kyung-taek; Almost, Maine, directed by Yi Sang-woo; and Comrades of the Century Wind, directed by Kim Soo-jin. Lee also collaborated with director Kim Dong-hyun on the play Beeul (Punishment). She has noted that the director's guidance during this production was a significant factor in her professional development. During rehearsals, Kim encouraged her to explore dramatic nuances beyond the comedic expressions she was primarily known for, an experience she describes as a lasting influence on her acting philosophy.

=== Theater Company Alleyway, film and television debut ===
Lee made her cinematic debut with a minor role in Choo Chang-min's film Late Blossom (2011). This was followed by other minor roles in Masquerade (2012) and Confession of Murder (2012).

Lee first met director Park Geun-hyung at the Namsan Drama Center while he was preparing Jeon Myeong-chul Biography. This initial encounter led to their collaboration. Subsequently, Lee participated when the Alleyway theater company decided to stage Ode to Youth for their 10th anniversary. In Ode to Youth, Lee played a coffee shop waitress who suffered from epilepsy. Following this, she officially joined the Alleyway theater company and appeared in July performance of Jeon Myeong-chul Biography. It was followed by lead role in youth drama Red Bus, written and directed by Park Geun-hyung.

In 2013, Lee began her acting career in television. Her first role was as a college friend of Na-jung (played by Go Ara) in tvN drama Reply 1994. Despite a brief appearance, she made a lasting impression as a college student from Yeosu who engaged in whose hometown was better dispute with Hae-tae (played by Son Ho-jun) from Suncheon.

In 2014, she starred in Park Geun-hyung's play, Manchurian Front, which explored the lives of young Koreans in Manchuria around 1940. Set in Xingjing (modern-day Changchun, China), the play followed students who met to discuss literature, history, and their shared ambition of achieving wealth and honor in Manchuria, aspiring to live like the Japanese. The play ran at Small Theater Siwol and was critically acclaimed, earning a spot as one of the BEST 7 performances of 2014 by the Korean Theater Company. She reprised her role in Manchurian Front when it served as the opening performance for the 2015 Seoul Theater Festival at the Daehakro Jayu Theater.

In 2015, Lee acted in play The House of Bernarda Alba. Lee landed her first supporting role in 2015 as Mi-ran in the JTBC drama Songgot: The Piercer, which starred Ji Hyun-woo and Ahn Nae-sang. The drama was based Choi Kyu-seok's webtoon Awl, inspired by a true story from 2007. This was followed by minor film roles including A Matter of Interpretation (2015), Girl On the Edge (2015), Life is but an Empty (2015). In 2016, Lee act in play Press Guideness. This was followed by minor film roles including Run Off (2016), and How to Break up with My Cat (2016).

In 2017, Lee played the role of a receptionist in the action-adventure film Okja, directed by Bong Joon-ho. Director Bong, is a fan of the theater company Alleyway. According to the assistant director of Okja, Bong remembered Lee from the play Manchurian Front, and she was cast after multiple meetings. In the Jang Hoon's A Taxi Driver (2017), Lee played a pregnant woman who received a free ride from taxi driver Kim Man-seop (played by Song Kang-ho).

That same year, Lee costarred in Yoo Je-won's Tomorrow, with You. She acted as Oh So-ri, best friend of Ma-rin (played by Shin Min-a) who runs piano academy. She then costarred in the drama While You Were Sleeping. In 2017 Lee signed exclusive contract with C-JeS Entertainment. Lee also joined the musical Heavy Metal Girls in 2017. This was followed by her appearance as Katya in the Korean premiere of the play Valentine's Day, a work by Golden Mask Award-winning artist Ivan Vymilfayev, at Jayu Small Theater until January 14, 2018.

In 2018, Lee appeared in the drama Life on Mars. She also played the older sister who informed Jong-su (Yoo Ah-in) that Haemi (Jeon Jong-seo) was a liar when he was searching for her in Lee Chang-dong's film Burning (2018). In December 2018, Creative Table Quartz confirmed Lee Bong-ryun's appearance in the Korean premiere of the one-man play Everything Shines on Me, an original work by Duncan McMillan that had participated in various overseas festivals, including Edinburgh and Perth in Australia, since the 2013 Lurdle Fringe Festival.

=== Critical acclaim and further recognition ===
In 2019, Lee appeared in several film and television projects, including the dramas When the Devil Calls Your Name and Melting Me Softly. In the film Birthday, she portrayed Jeong-suk, a relative providing support to the protagonists (Sul Kyung-gu) and Soon-nam (Jeon Do-yeon) following the loss of their son. She also appeared as the third older sister of Yong-nam (Jo Jung-seok) in the action film Exit, which recorded over 10 million admissions at the box office.

Lee gained wider recognition for her role in Kim Ji-young, Born 1982, film starring Jung Yu-mi and Gong Yoo. Based on the million-seller novel of the same name by Cho Nam-Joo, it was released on October 23, 2019. She portrayed Hye-soo, a character who encourages the protagonist's professional aspirations and assists in her return to the workforce. Her performance was noted for its portrayal of a supportive peer providing practical guidance to the titular character.

Lee has been a frequent cast member in productions staged by the National Theater Company of Korea. In 2020, she was cast as Princess Hamlet in the gender-blind production of Shakespeare's Hamlet for the National Theater Company's 70th anniversary. For this role, she won the 57th Baeksang Arts Awards for Best Actress in a Play.

In 2020, Lee starred in When the Weather Is Fine. In the latter half of the year, she held supporting roles in two television projects. She portrayed Myung-sook in Lee Eung-bok's Netflix series Sweet Home, a woman grieving the loss of her infant. As the narrative progresses, the character undergoes a transformation into a non-aggressive entity motivated by a protective instinct. Her portrayal was noted for its emotional depth and the character's unique behavioral traits within the series. Later in 2020, Lee appeared in the JTBC drama Run On as Park May, the CEO of an art film production company and the roommate of the protagonist, Oh Mi-joo (Shin Se-kyung). Her performance in the series was noted for the rapport established with co-star Shin.

In 2021, Lee collaborated with director Yoo Je-won and actress Shin Min-a in the tvN series Hometown Cha-Cha-Cha. She played Yeo Hwa-jung, a seafood restaurant owner and the village chief of Gongjin. In the series, her character is a divorcée co-parenting their son Yi-jun with her ex-husband, Jang Young-guk (In Gyo-jin), and serves as the landlady for Yoon Hye-jin (Shin Min-a). Later that year, Lee appeared as Hwang Ma-jin in the JTBC drama Only One Person. In November 2021, following the expiration of her previous contract, Lee signed an exclusive agreement with AM Entertainment.

In 2022, she acted as Deaconess Jung, Yo-hwan's church figure (portrayed by Hwang Jung-min) in the Netflix Original Series Narco-Saints. Also in 2022, Lee starred in her first film leading role opposite Lee Han-seo in director Jang Seon-hee's independent film Two Woman. The film depicted a chance encounter between a young girl delivering newspapers and a woman putting up flyers to find her lost child. It premiered at the 48th Seoul Independent Film Festival (SIFF).

There are stories that are difficult to share with close people. Isn't there a time when it seems that people who know me well don't know my heart anymore. This film depicts a magical moment in which you unknowingly tell a story to someone you met in an unexpected situation, so you can catch your breath for a while. When I first read the script, I felt fortunate. The conversation between the girl and the woman gave the two of them a chance to sit down and breathe for a while on their own arduous journey.

— Lee Bong-ryun, Marie Claire Korea

In 2023, Lee reunited with director Yoo Je-won and Jeon Do-yeon in the romantic-comedy TV series Crash Course in Romance, portraying Kim Young-joo, the best friend of Nam Haeng-seon (Jeon Do-yeon). Her performance was noted for complementing Jeon's acting. This was followed by a role in Destined With You.

In 2024, Lee made a special appearance in Yoo Je-won's drama Love Next Door and acted as an announcer in the film I, the Executioner. In 2025, she made a special appearance in Kim Won-seok's drama When Life Gives You Tangerines, written by Lim Sang-choon. Also in 2025, she starred in the tvN drama Resident Playbook, a spin-off of Hospital Playlist, where she was cast as Seo Jeong-min, a professor of obstetrics and gynecology at Jongno Yulje Hospital. Despite a one-year delay, the drama was successful, earning Lee a reward trip to Bali with the cast and crew.

== Personal life ==
Although Lee is Catholic, she selected her stage name, "Bong-ryeon," for its perceived Buddhist resonance. She was inspired by a segment on the television program VJ Special Forces regarding name changes, where she found the phonetics of the name familiar and humorous. For the Chinese character (Hanja) transcription, she chose 鳳輦 (Bong-ryeon), meaning "the king's palanquin," while noting the characters could be adapted to mean "peak" (峰) or "lotus" (蓮) in the future.

Lee married actor Lee Gyu-hee on March 11, 2019. The couple met as colleagues through the Alleyway Theater Company.

== Filmography ==
=== Film ===
Film performances
Year	Title		Role	Note	Ref.
Year	English	Korean	Role	Note	Ref.
2011	Late Blossom	그대를 사랑합니다	Dong Office employee		
2012	Masquerade	광해: 왕이 된 남자	Royal Kitchen Court Lady		
2012	Confession of Murder	내가 살인범이다	High School girl		
2015	A Matter of Interpretation	꿈보다 해몽	Landlady		
2015	Girl On the Edge	여고생	Nurse	Girl on the Edge (Yeo-go-saeng)	
2015	Life is but an Empty Dream	꿈보다 해몽	Eun-shil		
2016	Run Off	국가대표2	Dae-woong's younger sister		
2016	How to Break up with My Cat	어떻게 헤어질까	Sushi Chief's daughter		
2017	Okja	옥자	Mirando Korea's receptionist		
2017	A Taxi Driver	택시운전사	Pregnant woman		
2017	The Bros	부라더	Cousin's wife		
2018	Burning	버닝	Hae-mi's sister		
2018	Dark Figure of Crime	암수살인	Kang Sook-ja		
2018	Passing Summer	늦여름	Restaurant Owner		
2018	The Drug King	마약왕	Lee Doo-sook		
2019	A Haunting Hitchhike	히치하이크	Jecheon sanitarium nurse		
2019	Birthday	생일	Jung-sook		
2019	Exit	엑시트	Third Older sister		
2019	Kim Ji-young: Born 1982	82년생 김지영	Hye-soo		
2020	The Golden Holiday	국제수사	Bank employee		
2020	Samjin Company English Class	삼진그룹 영어토익반	General Affairs Department Miss Kim		
2021	Three Sisters	세자매	Supermarket lady		
2022	Two Woman	두 여인	lost woman	main lead	
2024	I, the Executioner	베테랑2	Announcer		

=== Television series ===
Television series appearances
Year	Title		Role	Note	Ref.
Year	English	Korean	Role	Note	Ref.
2013	Reply 1994	응답하라 1994	Na-jung's classmate		
2015	Songgot: The Piercer	송곳	Mi-ran		
2017	Tomorrow, with You	내일 그대와	Oh So-ri		
2017	My Father Is Strange	아버지가 이상해	Yoon-ryeon		
2017	Drama Special: "Madame Jung's Last Week"	KBS 드라마스페셜 - 정마담의 마지막 일주일	President Shin	one act-drama	
2017	While You Were Sleeping	당신이 잠든 사이에	Go Pil-sook		
2018	Life on Mars	라이프 온 마스	Yoo Soon-hee		
2019	When the Devil Calls Your Name	악마가 너의 이름을 부를 때	Nurse		
2019	Melting Me Softly	날 녹여주오	Park Yoo-ja		
2020	When the Weather Is Fine	날씨가 좋으면 찾아가겠어요	Jang Ha-nim		
2020–2023	Sweet Home	스위트홈	Im Myung-sook	Season 1–2	
2020–2021	Run On	런 온	Park Mae-yi		
2021	Hometown Cha-Cha-Cha	갯마을 차차차	Yeo Hwa-jung		
2021–2022	The One and Only	한 사람만	Hwang Ma-Jin		
2022	Extraordinary Attorney Woo	이상한 변호사 우영우	Ryu Jae-sook	Cameo (episode 12)	
2022	Narco-Saints	수리남	Deaconess Jung		
2023	Crash Course in Romance	일타 스캔들	Kim Young-joo		
2023	Destined With You	연애는 불가항력	Ma Eun-yeong		
2024	Love Next Door	엄마 친구 아들	Im Kyung-ran		
2025	When Life Gives You Tangerines	폭싹 속았수다	Doctor		
2025	Resident Playbook	언젠가는 슬기로울 전공의생활	Seo Jeong-min		
2025	Confidence Queen	컨피던스 맨 KR	Ye-sol's mother	Special appearance	
2025	Heroes Next Door	UDT: 우리 동네 특공대	Na Eun-jae		
2026	The Remarried Empress	재혼 황후	Eliza		

== Stage ==
=== Musical ===
Musical play performances
Year	Title		Role	Theater	Date	Ref.
Year	English	Korean	Role	Theater	Date	Ref.
2005	Five Sketches about Love	사랑에 관한 다섯개의 소묘	Virgin Lady	Small Theater Festival	April 7–May 22	
2005	Nunsense	넌센스Nunsense	Sister Robert Anne	Oriental Arts Theater 2 (Former Art Center K Semo Theater)	Nov 22–23	
2006–2007	Five Sketches about Love	사랑에 관한 다섯개의 소묘	Virgin Lady	Hansung Art Hall 2	Mar 13–Jun 15	
2008	Laundry	빨래	Laundry Owner (grandma)	Egg and Nucleus Small Theater	Aug 29–Dec 31	
2008	Romeo and Bernadette	로미오 & 베르나뎃	Viola Rose	Naru Art Center Grand Performance Hall	Jul 4–Aug 10	
2009	Rock Sitter	락시터	multi-girl	Daehangno Small Theater Festival	Jun 19–Aug 16	
2009	Rock Sitter	락시터	multi-girl	Busan	Aug 21–Sep 20	
2009–2010	Laundry	빨래	Laundry Owner (grandma)	Hakjeon Green Small Theater	July 24–June 27	
2010	Laundry	빨래	Laundry Owner (grandma)	Goyang Oulim Nuri Oulim Theater	Nov 18–21	
2010–2011	Laundry	빨래	Laundry Owner (grandma)	Hakjeon Green Small Theater	July 7–Jan 9	
2011	Rock Sitter	락시터	multi-girl	Daehakro Small Theater Festival	Mar 5–Jul 31	
2012	Laundry	빨래	Laundry Owner (grandma)	Hakjeon Green Small Theater	April 4–Oct 7	
2012	Find a Family Member	식구를 찾아서	Park Bok-nyeo	Chungmu Art Center Small Theater Blue	04.21—06.24	
2014–2015	Those Days	그날들	librarian	Daehangno Musical Center Grand Theater	Oct 21–Jan 18, 2015	
2015	Misseri Cordia	미제리꼬르디아		Doosan Art Center Space111	Jan 29–31	
2015	Heavy Metal Girls	헤비메탈 걸스	Eun-ju	Yegreen Theater	Feb 13–March 1	
2016	Board	판	Chun-seom	CJ Hideout Daehakro (SM Art Hall)	June 13–14	
2016	Secretly Greatly	은밀하게 위대하게	Ran/Jeong-seon	Uniplex 2	Feb 13–Mar 20	
2016	Those Days	그날들	librarian	Chungmu Art Center Grand Theater, Seoul	Aug 25–Nov 3	
2016	Those Days	그날들	librarian	Centum City Sohyang Theater Shinhan Card Hall, Busan	Dec 2–4	
2016	Those Days	그날들	librarian	Gyeonggi Arts Center Grand Theater, Suwon	Dec 10–11	
2016	Those Days	그날들	librarian	Guri Art Hall Cosmos Grand Theater, Guri	Dec 16–17	
2016	Those Days	그날들	librarian	GS Caltex Yeulmaru Grand Theater, Yeosu	Dec 23–25	
2017	Those Days	그날들	librarian	Seongnam Art Center Opera House	Jan 21–22	
2017	Those Days	그날들	librarian	Seoul Arts Center Opera Theater	Feb 7–Mar 5	
2022	Four Minutes	포미니츠	Traude Krueger	National Jeongdeong Theater Seoul	Jun 21–Aug 14	

=== Theater ===
Theater play performances
Year	Title		Role	Theater	Date	Ref.
Year	English	Korean	Role	Theater	Date	Ref.
2007	Bar	술집	Multi-role (other than Elizabeth)	Hansung Art Hall 2	Jul 19–Sep 30	
2008	When I was The Pretties	내가 가장 예뻤을 때	Hee-yoon	Hansung Art Hall 2	Mar 13–Jun 15	
2010	2010 Seoul Theatre Olympics - Roberto Zucco	2010 서울연극올림픽 - 로베르토 쥬코		Daehakro Arts Theater Small Theater	Oct 18–19	
2010–2011	Almost Maine	올모스트 메인	Marvalyn, Gayle, Rhonda	Art One Chaimu Theater	Dec 22–Jan 30	
2011	Colleagues of the Hundred Years of Wind Doosan Art Center Gyeon-in Series 2	백년 바람의 동료들두산아트센터 경계인시리즈2	Kyung Hee	Doosan Art Center Space111	Jun 07–Jul 02	
2011	Beeul (Punishment)	벌	Seo Mi-young	Myeongdong Arts Theater	Oct 13–30	
2012	Ode to Youth	청춘예찬	Female	old studio 76	Jan 24–Feb 10	
2012	Ode to Youth	청춘예찬	Female	Daehangno Seondol Theater	Mar 06–Apr 07	
2012	Jeon Myeong-chul's Biography	전명출 평전	Jong-ran	Namsan Arts Center Drama Center	Jul 10–29	
2012	Samguk Yusa Project— Dream	삼국유사 프로젝트 - 꿈	Anak, old woman, Seonmyo	National Theater Company Baek Baek Hee Jang Min Ho Theater	Sep 1–16	
2012	Red Bus	빨간버스	Bong-ryeon	National Theater Company Small Theater	Nov 22–Dec 16	
2013	Asian Onsen	아시아 온천	Lark	Seoul Arts Center CJ Towol Theater	Jun 11–16	
2013	The Piped Man	피리부는 사나이		Daehangno Seondol Theater	Jul 05–Aug 04	
2013	Too Many Hearts Will Hurt You	다정도 병인 양하여	current PD	National Theater Company Small Theater	Dec 6–29	
2014	Come See Me	배우 날 보러와요	Mrs. Nam	Oriental Arts Theater 2 (Former Art Center K Semo Theater)	Mar 27–Jun 01	
2014	Manchurian Front	만주전선	Geiko	Aruto Small Theater (Sodam Small Theater)	Jun 13–29	
2014	Romeo and Juliet	로미오와 줄리엣	nanny	Daehangno Guerrilla Theater	Jul 11–27	
2014	Manchurian Front	만주전선	Geiko	Aruto Small Theater (Sodam Small Theater)	Aug 08–31	
2014	Factory	공장	Jeong-mi	Lee Hae-Rang Arts Theater	Oct 02–11	
2014	In That House Villa We	그 집 빌라에서 우리는	Mitsuo	Daehangno beautiful theater	Dec 04–31	
2015	Manchurian Front	만주전선	Geiko	Daehakro Jayu Theater	April 4–15	
2015	Red Bus	빨간버스	Bong-ryeon	Kyungsung University Yenoso Theater	May 12–16	
2015	The House of Bernarda Alba	베르나르다 알바의 집	Angustias	Daehangno beautiful theater	June 18–28	
2015	Manchurian Front - Ansan	만주전선	Geiko	Ansan Arts Center Byeolmuri Theater	Sep 10–12	
2015	Manchurian Front - Ansan	만주전선	Geiko	Goyang Aram Nuri Sara Sae Theater	Oct 22–24	
2015	Manchurian Front - Ansan	만주전선	Geiko	Incheon Culture and Arts Center Small Performance Hall	Nov 13–14	
2016	Come See Me	배우 날 보러와요	Park Gi-ja	Myeongdong Arts Theater	Jan 22–Feb 21	
2016	Press Guidelines	보도지침	female	Yes 24 Stage 3	Mar 26–Jun 12	
2016	Stealing Picasso	피카소 훔치기	Cassie Smith	Daehakro Arts Theater Small Theater	Nov 05–13	
2016–2017	Ode to Youth	청춘예찬	female	Art Forest Art Hall 1	Dec 08–Feb 12	
2017	1945	1945	Song Kik-soon	Myeongdong Arts Theater	July 5–30	
2017	I'm a Murderer	나는 살인자입니다	Youth, Neighbors, Star, Guest3, Supervisor, Government	National Theater Company Small Theater	Nov 10–27	
2017–2018	Valentine's Day	발렌타인 데이	Qiam	Seoul Arts Center Jayu Small Theater	Dec 23–Jan 14	
2018	Every Briliant Things	내게 빛나는 모든 것		Doosan Art Center Space111	Dec 1–25	
2019	I'm a Murderer	나는 살인자입니다	Youth, Neighbors, Star, Guest3, Supervisor, Government	National Theater Company Baek Baek Hee Jang Minho Theater	April 24–May 19	
2019	Botko Chan	봇코짱	Botko-chan	Tokyo Arts Theater East Theater	May 30–June 2	
2019	Summer is hot and winter is long	여름은 덥고 겨울은 길다		Theater Out	Jul 5–21	
2019–2020	Mary Jane	메리 제인	Mary Jane	Hongik University Daehangno Art Center Small Theater	Dec 7–Jan 19	
2020	Doosan Humanities Theater 2020 Food - Ultimate Taste	두산인문극장 2020 푸드 - 궁극의 맛	Prison inmate	Doosan Art Center Space111	June 2–20	
2021	Hamlet	햄릿	Hamlet	National Theater (online)	Feb 25–27	
2021	Cosmos	코스모스	Mayumi	Daehakro Art Space Hyehwa	Mar 12–28	

== Awards ==
Award	Year	Category	Work	Result	Ref.
Baeksang Arts Awards	2021	Best Actress – Theatre	Hamlet	Won	
