= Kim Ji-young, Born 1982 (film) =

2019 South Korean drama film

- Theatrical release poster
- Hangul: 82년생 김지영
- RR: 82nyeonsaeng Gim Jiyeong
- MR: 82nyŏnsaeng Kim Chiyŏng
- Directed by: Kim Do-young
- Screenplay by: Yoo Young-ah
- Based on: Kim Ji-young, Born 1982 by Cho Nam-joo
- Produced by: Mo Il-young
- Starring: Jung Yu-mi; Gong Yoo
- Cinematography: Lee Sung-jae
- Edited by: Shin Min-gyung
- Music by: Kim Tae-sung
- Production company: Spring Wind Film Company
- Distributed by: Lotte Cultureworks
- Release date: October 23, 2019
- Running time: 118 minutes
- Country: South Korea
- Language: Korean
- Box office: US$27.7 million

Kim Ji-young, Born 1982 (Korean: 82년생 김지영) is a 2019 South Korean drama film starring Jung Yu-mi and Gong Yoo. Based on the million-seller novel of the same name by Cho Nam-Joo, it was released on October 23, 2019. The film is about the story of Kim Ji-young, a woman in her 30s who starts acting strangely, seemingly possessed by her mother and late grandmother after becoming a stay at home mom.

== Plot ==
The film starts off by showing Ji-young (Jung Yu-mi) doing typical housewife activities. She is a stay-at-home mom whose main responsibility is raising her daughter whilst her husband, Dae-hyun (Gong Yoo) works a day job at an office. Through flashbacks we see that Ji-young used to work at a marketing firm and was happy while she was being productive and having a career. She also looked up to one of her female seniors, team leader Kim, who has risen to quite a high position in the company whilst being a mother at the same time as there is discrimination towards working mothers in the workplace. On one occasion team leader Kim calls in Ji-young to praise her for doing well at work.

A few years later, now as a stay-at-home mom, Ji-young starts to develop feelings of being trapped and unfulfilled. As well as losing a bit of her personal identity, she also suffers from postpartum depression. Due to all these, Ji-young unknowingly started to develop a mental disorder which consists of her seemingly becoming briefly possessed by the personality of her mother or late grandmother. During these possessions she will start to act and say things that her mother or late grandmother would say, even going as far as to mimic their vocal tones. She usually starts acting like this under situations where she feels a significant amount of stress or underlying unhappiness; for instance, during a visit to her mother-in-law's house and some instances in front of Dae-hyun. Dae-hyun starts to notice this and becomes very concerned, he starts to video record instances of Ji-young's possessions and eventually approaches a psychiatrist and asks her for help, to which the psychiatrist requests to see Jiyoung immediately.

Dae-hyun subtly encourages Ji-young to go and see the psychiatrist by giving her the psychiatrist's card. However, to his disappointment, Ji-young does not see through on the appointment as she realizes how expensive the sessions would be. Still feeling despondent while being a stay-at-home mother, Ji-young starts to contemplate working again, and considers getting a part-time job working at a bakery. Eventually, Ji-young decides to get in contact with team leader Kim who has started her own marketing firm. Dae-hyun realizes how important work is for Ji-young and how it has the potential to cure her strange malady. He encourages Ji-young to return to work and says that he will take parental leave for a year and become a stay-at-home father and take over the responsibility of raising their daughter. Ji-young is happy to return to work. While her strange bouts of possession continue to plague her at home, they do not happen as often, and she is notably in better moods.

When Dae-hyun's mother learns that Dae-hyun had taken parental leave in order for Ji-young to return to the workplace, she is enraged and calls Ji-young to scold her for hindering Dae-hyun's career progression. She demands that Ji-young quits her job and return to being a stay-at-home mother. Dae-hyun returns his mother's call and reveal the truth of Ji-young's possession and mental instability. He referenced an instance of it occurring during Ji-young's visit to her house. Ji-young's mother eventually witnesses an instance of Ji-young's possession first-hand and cries at the sight.

One day, Ji-young finally confronts Dae-hyun about his insistent urge for her to seek professional counselling as she is still personally unaware of her possession. Dae-hyun relents and shows Ji-young video recordings he had taken when Ji-young undergoes her possessions. Shocked to discover this, Ji-young agrees to see the psychiatrist. She also quits her job as she believes it is healthier to stay out of work while she recovers.

Ji-young becomes a stay-at-home mother again, but this time, as per her psychiatrist's encouragement, she begins documenting her emotions in a journal. As she attends more sessions, she also becomes more open about the unhappiness she had experienced due to sexual discrimination in her workplace. As well as the overall discrimination women in the workplace have suffered as they are deemed less competent than their male colleagues, Ji-young is also mocked by her juniors as they view her as a freeloader scrounging off her husband. Ji-young shares her feelings and fears of falling behind others in society and how that has affected her.

Emboldened by these psychiatric sessions, Ji-young becomes more outspoken in public, speaking up for herself when she hears her colleagues talking bad about her behind her back. Eventually, she also starts writing opinion pieces and personal accounts for magazines, and voicing concerns about issues that mothers and women face in South Korea. As Ji-young becomes happier and healthier, the movie ends with her sitting down at a desk and starting the first line of her self-titled memoir, implying that she has also decided to become an author.

== Cast ==
=== Main ===
- Jung Yu-mi as Kim Ji-young, Dae-hyun's wife, former employee of the company and housewife with some unusual symptoms
  - Kim Ha-yeon as 12 year old Ji-young
- Gong Yoo as Jung Dae-hyun, Ji-young's husband and employees of the company who noticed her abnormality

=== Supporting ===
- Kim Mi-kyung as Kim Mi-sook, Ji-young's mother who open the restaurant
- Gong Min-jeung as Kim Eun-young, Ji-young's older sister who has a career as a teacher
- Lee Na-yoon as Young Kim Eun-young
- Park Sung-yeon as Kim Eun-sil, team leader
- Kim Sung-cheol as Kim Ji-seok, Ji-young's younger brother
- Lee Bong-ryun as Hye-soo
- Kim Gook-hee as Soo-bin's mother
- Lee Eol as Young-soo
- Cha Mi-kyung as Mrs.Jung, Dae-hyun's mother
- Son Sung-chan as Mr.Jung, Dae-hyun's father
- Woo Ji-hyun as Byung-shik
- Kang Ae-shim as Ji-young's grandmother
- Yoon Sa-bong as Soo-hyun

=== Special appearances ===
- Ye Soo-jung as Ji-young's grandmother
- Yeom Hye-ran as Woman with scarf in the past

== Production ==
=== Development ===
The film marks actress-turned-director Kim Do-young's debut feature film. While adapting the novel into a film, Kim's "biggest task was to weave the series of independent episodes in the original material into a story with a central narrative."

=== Casting ===
On September 12, 2018, Jung Yu-mi was confirmed to play the titular role of the film. On October 17, Gong Yoo was confirmed to play Kim Ji-young's husband, starring for the third time alongside Jung Yu-mi after Silenced (2011) and Train to Busan (2016). After these announcements, the cast received hateful comments from anti-feminists (comments which had already been made when the novel became popular in South Korea), but both actors "said that they didn't mind the haters as much as many had feared [and] instead, their desire to do the story justice was their main focus."

=== Filming ===
Principal photography began on January 21, 2019, in Gwangmyeong. Filming was completed in April.

== Release ==
On September 21, 2019, a character poster featuring Jung Yu-mi was released with the announcement of an October release. On September 26, the official trailer was released. On October 12, it was confirmed that the film would premiere on the 23rd.

The film will be screened at the 2nd Pyeongchang International Peace Film Festival, whose year's theme is "woman," in June 2020 in the Spectrum K section.

== Impact ==
According to a study made by the National Library of Korea, Cho Nam-joo's Kim Ji-young, Born 1982 was the most borrowed novel in South Korea in 2019 for the second consecutive year. The book was mostly borrowed by women in their 40s and the number of loans increased by 43% in October when the film was released.

== Reception ==
=== Box office ===
In South Korea, the film topped the box office for the week of October 27, 2019. It surpassed 1 million moviegoers in five days, 2 million in eleven days and 3 million in eighteen days. As of November 2020, the film has reached 3,679,099 total admissions grossing $27,168,574 in revenue.

=== Critical response ===
According to Pierce Conran of the Korean Film Council, "reviews for the film have been strong while the largely female audience (roughly 68%, according to Naver portal viewer ratings) have also been extremely positive."

=== Accolades ===
Year	Award	Category	Recipient(s)	Result	Ref.
2019	20th Women In Film Korea Festival	Best Actress	Jung Yu-mi	Won	
2019	16th Hong Kong Asian Film Festival	Cineaste Delights	Kim Ji-young, Born 1982	Won	
2020	56th Grand Bell Awards	Best Actress	Jung Yu-mi	Won	
2020	56th Grand Bell Awards	Best New Director	Kim Do-young	Nominated	
2020	56th Grand Bell Awards	Best Planning	Mo Il-young	Nominated	
2020	25th Chunsa Film Art Awards	Best Actress	Jung Yu-mi	Nominated	
2020	25th Chunsa Film Art Awards	Best Supporting Actress	Kim Mi-kyung	Won	
2020	25th Chunsa Film Art Awards	Best New Director	Kim Do-young	Won	
2020	56th Baeksang Arts Awards	Best Film	Kim Ji-young, Born 1982	Nominated	
2020	56th Baeksang Arts Awards	Best Actress	Jung Yu-mi	Nominated	
2020	56th Baeksang Arts Awards	Best Supporting Actress	Kim Mi-kyung	Nominated	
2020	56th Baeksang Arts Awards	Best New Director	Kim Do-young	Won	
2020	29th Buil Film Awards	Best Director	Kim Do-young	Nominated	
2020	29th Buil Film Awards	Best Actress	Jung Yu-mi	Won	
2020	14th Asian Film Awards	Best Actress	Jung Yu-mi	Nominated	
2020	40th Korean Association of Film Critics Awards	Best Actress	Jung Yu-mi	Won	
2020	40th Korean Association of Film Critics Awards	Best Supporting Actress	Kim Mi-kyung	Won	
2021	41st Blue Dragon Film Awards	Best Film	Kim Ji-young, Born 1982	Nominated	
2021	41st Blue Dragon Film Awards	Best Leading Actress	Jung Yu-mi	Nominated	
2021	41st Blue Dragon Film Awards	Popular Star Award	Jung Yu-mi	Won	
2021	41st Blue Dragon Film Awards	Best Supporting Actress	Kim Mi-kyung	Nominated	
2021	41st Blue Dragon Film Awards	Best New Director	Kim Do-young	Nominated	
2021	41st Blue Dragon Film Awards	Best Screenplay	Yoo Young-ah	Nominated	
2021	41st Blue Dragon Film Awards	Best Editing	Shin Min-kyung	Nominated	
