= Fasten Your Seatbelt =

Fasten Your Seatbelt may refer to:

- Fasten Your Seatbelt (film), a 2013 South Korean film
- Fasten Your Seatbelts, a 2014 Italian film
- "Tarantula / Fasten Your Seatbelt", a 2005 single by Pendulum
