= Men of Plastic =

2022 South Korean film

- Theatrical release poster
- Hangul: 압꾸정
- RR: Apkkujeong
- MR: Apkkujŏng
- Directed by: Lim Jin-sun
- Written by: Shin Yeon-shick; Lim Jin-sun
- Produced by: Ma Dong-seok
- Starring: Ma Dong-seok; Jung Kyung-ho; Oh Na-ra; Choi Byung-mo; Oh Yeon-seo
- Cinematography: Lee Seong-je
- Edited by: Lee Gang-hui
- Music by: Kim Hong-jib; Lee Jin-hui
- Production companies: Big Punch Pictures; Hong film; B.A. Entertainment
- Distributed by: Showbox
- Release date: November 30, 2022
- Running time: 112 minutes
- Country: South Korea
- Language: Korean
- Box office: US$4.5 million

Men of Plastic (Korean: 압꾸정; RR: Apkkujeong) is a 2022 South Korean comedy drama film directed by Lim Jin-sun. It follows Dae-guk, (Ma Dong-seok), a native of Apgujeong with an overbearing meddlesome nature, and Ji-woo (Jung Kyung-ho), a prickly plastic surgeon who relies solely on his skills, as they usher in the golden era of the plastic surgery business in Gangnam. The film was released on November 30, 2022.

== Synopsis ==
Dae-guk, a native of Apgujeong-dong, with an endless stream of business ideas and a natural gift for persuasion, crosses paths with Ji-woo, a once-renowned top plastic surgeon looking to make a comeback. Recognizing Ji-woo's ambition and potential at a glance, Dae-guk instinctively senses that it's time to put his business acumen to the test. With his unstoppable drive, Daeguk brings together Ji-woo's surgical skills, insider Mi-jeong's extensive network, financial backing from Apgujeong's big spender Tae-cheon, and the powerful connections of Gyu-ok. Their goal is to build not just Apgujeong's leading plastic surgery clinic, but to transform it into Asia's ultimate beauty capital.

== Cast ==
- Ma Dong-seok as Dae-guk, a native Apgujeong-dong resident with a booming business idea
- Jung Kyung-ho as Park Ji-woo, a talented plastic surgeon who loses his medical license.
- Oh Na-ra as Oh Mi-jeong, the head of Insa Plastic Surgery's consultation office.
- Choi Byung-mo as Cho Tae-cheon, a charismatic businessman.
- Oh Yeon-seo as Hong Gyu-ok, the director of an Apgujeong VIP esthetic shop.
- Oh Hee-joon as Valet
- Nam Mi-jung as Man Ki-cheon
- Ryu Seung-soo
- Im Hyung-joon
- Han Bo-reum
- Jung Ji-so

== Production ==
Principal photography began in August 2020 and ended on November 20, 2020.

On October 30, 2022, it was confirmed that the film's press conference was canceled due to the Itaewon Halloween crowd crush.
