= Jung Kyung-ho =

South Korean actor (born 1983)

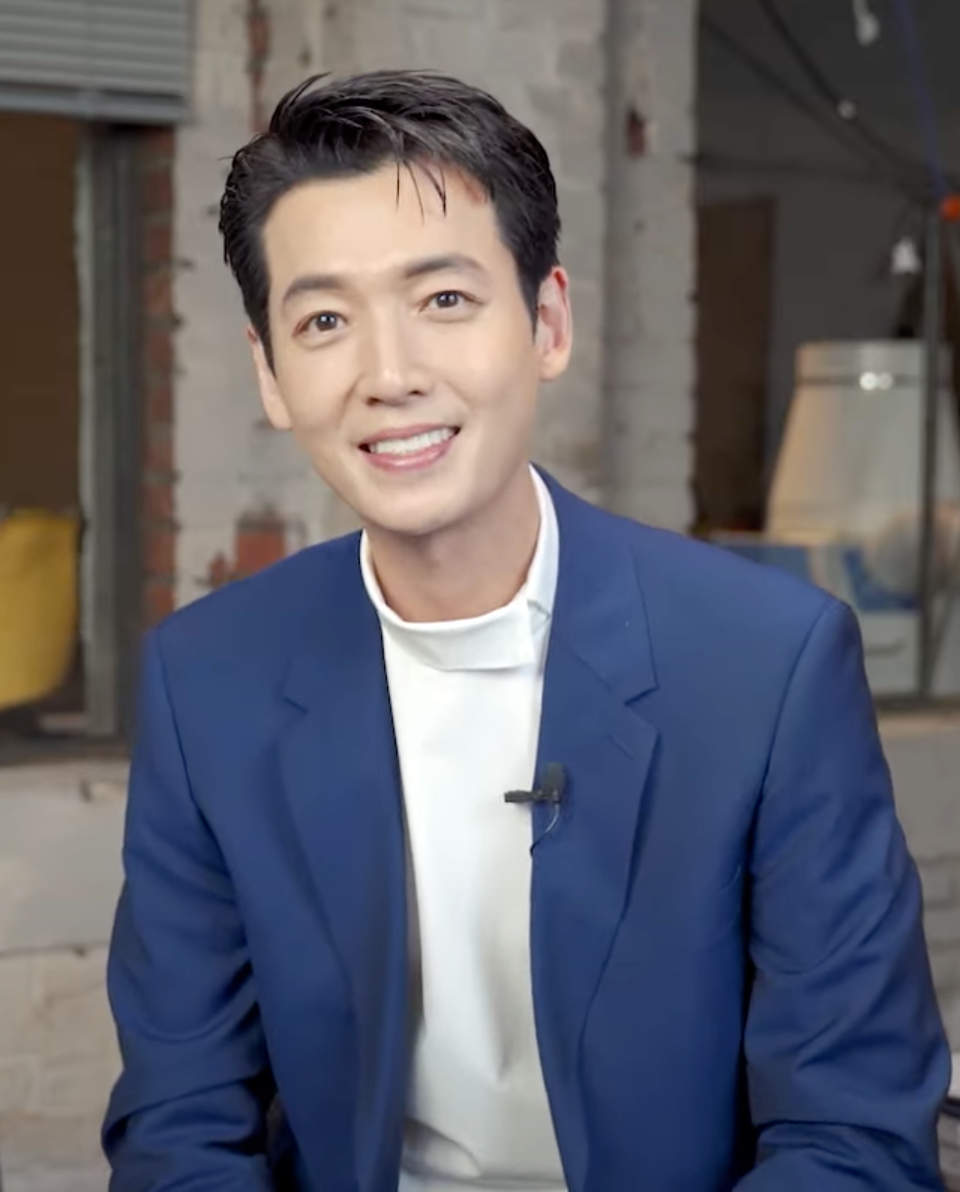
- Jung in September 2021
- Born: August 31, 1983 (age 43); Gwangmyeong, Gyeonggi Province, South Korea
- Education: Chung-Ang University (Theater)
- Occupation: Actor
- Years active: 2004–present
- Agent: Management Allum
- Father: Jung Eul-young

Korean name
- Hangul: 정경호
- Hanja: 鄭敬淏
- RR: Jeong Gyeongho
- MR: Chŏng Kyŏngho
- Website: allum.co.kr

Jung Kyung-ho (Korean: 정경호; born August 31, 1983) is a South Korean actor. He first gained recognition for starring in the television series Missing Nine (2017), Prison Playbook (2017–2018), and Life on Mars (2018) before gaining prominence with the first and second seasons of Hospital Playlist (2020–2021). Since then, he has starred in the series Crash Course in Romance (2023) and Oh My Ghost Clients (2025).

== Early life and education ==
Jung was born in Gwangmyeong, and is the son of Jung Eul-young, a veteran TV director and frequent collaborator of writer Kim Soo-hyun. Jung's father initially opposed his dream of pursuing acting, which led Jung to move out of the family home and not speak to his father for three years before finally reconciling.

Jung was accepted to the theater department of Chung-Ang University. During his freshman year, he became roommates with an older theater major named Ha Jung-woo. Jung has said that his eventual decision to become an actor was influenced by seeing Ha perform onstage. It was Ha who persuaded Jung to try out for the KBS actors' audition in 2003.

== Career ==
=== Early career and breakthrough ===
Jung passed the KBS actors' audition, and was soon signed by leading talent agency SidusHQ. Along with four other newcomers from the agency, he made his acting debut in 5 Stars, a mobile drama produced by SidusHQ and broadcast over SK Telecom. A few minor roles on KBS followed.

Jung's first major break came in the 2004 melodrama series I'm Sorry, I Love You, playing the supporting role of an actor who belatedly falls for his childhood friend (Im Soo-jung) and who has an unusually close relationship with his mother. The series was a critical and commercial hit. Following the conclusion of this series, Jung was cast in two films in 2005: All for Love, and When Romance Meets Destiny.

After playing his first leading film role in Gangster High (2006), Jung returned to television in the well-received action drama Time Between Dog and Wolf (2007), in which he and Lee Joon-gi played NIS agents. His portrayal of a policeman who unknowingly becomes interested in an autistic young woman (Kang Hye-jung) in the film Herb netted him a Best New Actor award at the Chunsa Film Art Awards. Jung then played a 1980s-era college student tutoring a high school girl (Cha Soo-yeon) in surreal romance For Eternal Hearts, which was the opening film for the 2007 Puchon International Fantastic Film Festival.

Director Lee Joon-ik then cast Jung in Sunny (2008) as a double bassist in a "consolatory band" who helps the heroine (Soo Ae) find her husband during the Vietnam War. The year after, he played a fugitive who faces off against a small town detective (Kim Yoon-seok) in Running Turtle (2009).

For his first role in a historical drama, Jung played a Goguryeo prince torn between love and duty in Ja Myung Go (2009), based on the folktale Prince Hodong and the Princess of Nakrang. Although Ja Myung Go received lackluster ratings, Jung bounced back with a leading role in the popular family drama Smile, You, starring alongside Lee Min-jung. Of playing an endearing "beta male," Jung said, "I am glad to be able to play a fun character and work on a fun script."

Later in 2010, Jung appeared in a one-act Drama Special episode, The Great Gye Choon-bin, playing an art therapist who overcomes his fear of the dark through his relationship with a kindergarten teacher.

=== 2013–2016: Post-military enlistment ===
Following his two-year mandatory enlistment in the Korean military, Heartless City (2013) became Jung's first acting project post-army, a noir crime drama, playing a conflicted antihero to critical acclaim.

He next starred as an arrogant Hallyu star in the comedy Rollercoaster (released internationally as Fasten Your Seatbelt). It was the directorial debut of actor Ha Jung-woo, Jung's friend and fellow college alumni/agency mate in Fantagio.

In 2014, he appeared in the 1970s-set period drama Endless Love, followed by the role of a psychopathic serial killer in Manhole. He also starred in Beating Again, a romantic drama about cellular memory after a heart transplant.

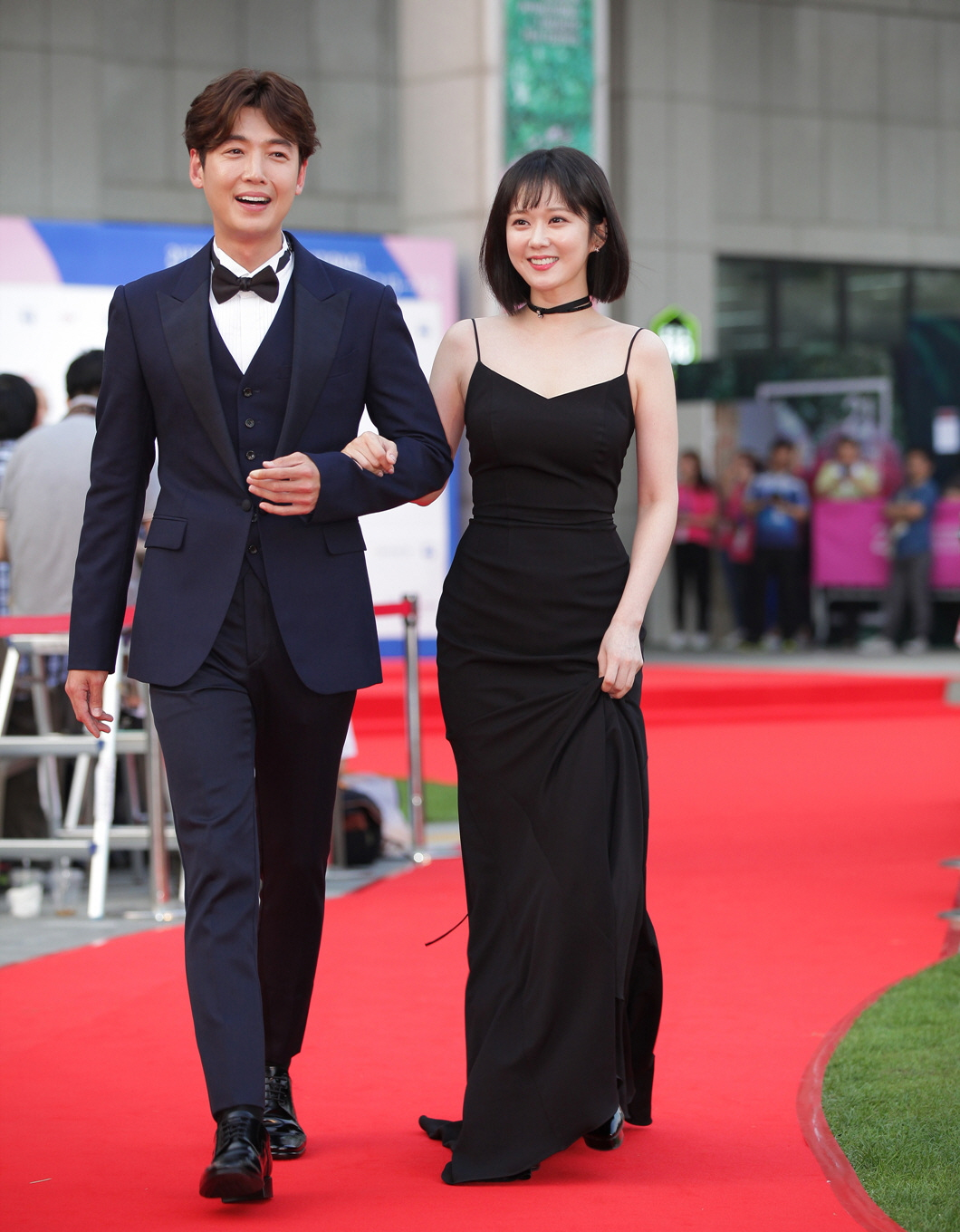
Jung in 2017 alongside Jang Na-ra

In 2016, he appeared in the romantic comedy series One More Happy Ending. Jung played a single father who worked as reporter-photographer of gossip magazine "Masspunch", Song Soo-hyuk, love interest of main lead Han Mi-mo, acted by Jang Na-ra.

=== 2017–2020: Rising popularity and breakthrough ===
In 2017, Jung starred in disaster drama Missing Nine, followed by the critically acclaimed Shin Won-ho's black comedy series Prison Playbook. Jung acted as Lee Joon-ho, an elite prison guard. The series was a commercial hit and became one of the highest rated Korean series on cable television history.

In 2018, Jung was cast as the lead role in Korean remake of British crime drama Life on Mars. Directed by Lee Jung-hyo, the series received acclaim from viewers, and Jung was praised for his convincing portrayal of a dazed detective.

In 2019, Jung starred in the occult melodrama When the Devil Calls Your Name. Jung acted as Ha Rip (Seo Dong-cheon), a star composer who has sold his soul to a titular devil. In December, Jung made a special appearance in the popular drama Crash Landing on You as the ex-boyfriend of Yoon Se-ri (Son Ye-jin), which was facilitated by his connection with the production director, Lee Jung-hyo.

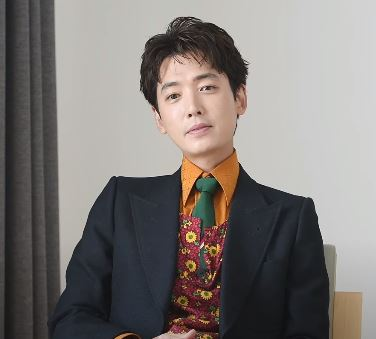
Jung for Marie Claire Korea in July 2020

In 2020, Jung reunited with director Shin Won-ho in the critically acclaimed medical drama Hospital Playlist as Kim Jun-wan, an associate professor of cardiothoracic surgery. He reprised his role in season 2 in 2021.

On August 24, 2021, it was announced that Jung, Jo Jung-suk, Jeon Mi-do, Yoo Yeon-seok, and Kim Dae-myung were attached to start filming Na Yeong-seok's new variety show in Gangwon Province on September 6.

=== 2021–present: Leading roles and theater debut ===
In 2021, Jung was cast in his first theater production as Prior Walter in the Korean premiere of Tony Kushner's award-winning play, Angels in America. The National Theater Company of Korea's premiere of Angels in America - Part One: The Millennium Approaches was held from November 26 to December 26 at the Myeongdong Arts Theater. He reprised his role as Prior Walter in The National Theater Company of Korea's premiere of Angels in America - Part Two: Perestroika. His performance gained critical recognition and earned him a nomination for Best Actor in Theater in 2022 Baeksang Arts Award.

In 2022, Jung returned to the big screen with The Great Dancer and Men of Plastic.

He then starred alongside Jeon Do-yeon in Yoo Je-won's romantic-comedy drama Crash Course in Romance which premiered on tvN in January 2023. According to Good Data Corporation, Crash Course in Romance ranked first with a topical share of 23.8% in Top 10 of TV Topicality Ranking in the drama category in four weeks in a row. Jung Kyung-ho ranked first in the performer category for five consecutive weeks.

== Personal life ==
=== Relationship ===
Jung was in a relationship with singer and actress Choi Soo-young of Girls' Generation from 2012 to 2026.

=== Business ===
In April 2008, he and actor Yoo Ha-jun became business partners and launched the internet shopping mall Double Bill, which sold vintage and trendy clothes for men.

=== Military service ===
Jung enlisted on November 30, 2010, to serve his mandatory military service in the Korean military as an active-duty soldier with the 306th draft. He was later transferred to the military band in Yongin, then discharged on September 4, 2012, with a commendation from the Army Chief of Staff.

== Filmography ==
=== Film ===
Year	Title	Role	Notes	Ref.
2005	All for Love	Yoo Jung-hoon		
2005	When Romance Meets Destiny	Kim Il-woong		
2006	Gangster High	Lee Sang-ho		
2007	Herb	Lee Jong-beom		
2007	For Eternal Hearts	Soo-young		
2008	Beastie Boys		Cameo	
2008	Sunny	Yong-deuk		
2009	Running Turtle	Song Gi-tae		
2013	Fasten Your Seatbelt	Ma Joon-gyu		
2014	Manhole	Soo-chul		
2015	Amor	Tae-woo		
2018	Deja Vu	Choi Hyun-suk		
2022	Daemuga	Pil-su		
2022	Men of Plastic	Ji-woo		
2025	Boss	Kang-pyo		

=== Television series ===
Year	Title	Role	Notes	Ref.
2004	Sweet 18	Jung-sook's blind date		
2004	You Will Know	Ha Ki-ho		
2004	5 Stars			
2004	I'm Sorry, I Love You	Choi Yoon		
2005	My Sweetheart My Darling	Yoo In-chul		
2007	Time Between Dog and Wolf	Kang Min-ki		
2009	Ja Myung Go	Prince Ho-Dong		
2009	Smile, You	Kang Hyun-soo		
2010	Road No. 1	Man who picks up garbage to sell	Cameo (Ep. 5)	
2010	Drama Special "The Great Gye Choon-bin"	Wang Gi-nam		
2013	Heartless City	Jung Shi-hyun		
2013	After School: Lucky or Not	Doctor	Cameo	
2013	Drama Festival "Crow's-Eye View"	Bon-woong		
2014	Endless Love	Han Gwang-cheol		
2014	Drama Festival "House, Mate"	Seok-jin	Cameo	
2015	Beating Again	Kang Min-ho		
2015	My First Time	Police officer	Cameo (Ep. 2)	
2015	High-End Crush	Entertainment news anchor	Cameo (Ep. 7, 13 and 20)	
2016	One More Happy Ending	Song Soo-hyuk		
2017	Missing 9	Seo Joon-oh		
2017	Prison Playbook	Lee Joon-ho		
2018	Life on Mars	Han Tae-joo		
2018	Tale of Fairy	Jeum Dol the Egg / Blue Dragon	Voice cameo	
2019	When the Devil Calls Your Name	Ha Rip / Seo Dong-cheon		
2019	Crash Landing on You	Cha Sang-woo	Cameo (Ep. 1, 5 and 7)	
2020–2021	Hospital Playlist	Kim Jun-wan	Season 1-2	
2023	Crash Course in Romance	Choi Chi-yeol		
2023	O'PENing: Shoot Me	The owner of a PC room	Cameo	
2024	Wedding Impossible	Yoon Chae-won's date	Cameo (Ep. 4)	
2025	Resident Playbook	Kim Jun-wan	Special appearance (Ep. 4)	
2025	Oh My Ghost Clients	Noh Moo-jin		
2025	Pro Bono	Kang David		

=== Variety shows ===
Year	Title	Role	Ref.
2013	SNL Korea	Host	
2013	Life Talk Show Taxi	Cast member	
2021	Wise Mountain Village Life	Cast member	

=== Music video appearances ===
Year	Title	Artist	Ref.
2006	"Confession"	4Men	
2008	"Doll + A Man's Love"	Zia	
2008	"Violin + Miss You"	Zia	
2015	"Wind Breeze"	Outsider feat. Lee Eun-mi	
2025	"Doctor! Doctor!"	Zerobaseone	

== Theater ==
Theater play performance
Year	Title	Role	Theater	Date	Ref.
2021	Angels in America Part 1	Prior Walter	National Theater Myeongdong Arts Theater	November 26 to December 26	
2022	Angels in America Part 2	Prior Walter	National Theater Myeongdong Arts Theater	February 28 to March 27	

== Discography ==
Year	Title	Artist	Album
2004	"5 Stars"	Jung Kyung-ho & ..	OST of the film 5 Stars
2004	"Precious Person" (소중한 사람)	Jung Kyung-ho	I'm Sorry, I Love You OST
2006	"Gangster High"	Jung Kyung-ho, Lee Tae Sung & ..	Gangster High OST
2015	"Red Carpet" (레드카펫) (J.star ver.)	Outsider feat. Jung Kyung-ho	Pride and Prejudice
2019	"The Street You Left"	Liver & Gallbladder (Jung Kyung-ho & Kim Hyung-Mook)	When the Devil Calls Your Name OST (Special Edition)
2019	"When I am In Busan"	Jung Kyung-ho	When the Devil Calls Your Name OST
2019	"Where Is the Dream"	Jung Kyung-ho	When the Devil Calls Your Name OST
2019	"Everyday"	Jung Kyung-ho	Non-album single
2021	"Reminiscence"	Jung Kyung-ho	Hospital Playlist 2 OST

== Accolades ==
=== Awards and nominations ===
Year	Award	Category	Nominated work	Result	Ref.
2004	KBS Drama Awards	Best New Actor	I'm Sorry, I Love You	Nominated	
2006	43rd Grand Bell Awards	Best New Actor	All for Love	Nominated	
2007	15th Chunsa Film Art Awards	Best New Actor	Herb	Won	
2007	6th Korean Film Awards	Best New Actor	Herb	Nominated	
2008	4th Premiere Rising Star Awards	Best New Actor	Sunny	Won	
2008	29th Blue Dragon Film Awards	Best Supporting Actor	Sunny	Nominated	
2009	46th Grand Bell Awards	Best Supporting Actor	Sunny	Nominated	
2009	4th Andre Kim Best Star Awards	Male Star Award	—N/a	Won	
2009	SBS Drama Awards	Excellence Award, Actor in a Special Planning Drama	Smile, You	Nominated	
2009	SBS Drama Awards	Producer's Award	Smile, You, Ja Myung Go	Won	
2013	DramaFever Awards	Best Bad Boy	Heartless City	Won	
2014	34th Golden Cinema Festival	Best New Actor	Fasten Your Seatbelt	Won	
2014	SBS Drama Awards	Excellence Award, Actor in a Serial Drama	Endless Love	Nominated	
2016	2016 MBC Drama Awards	Top Excellence Award, Actor in a Miniseries	One More Happy Ending	Nominated	
2017	MBC Drama Awards	Best Character Award, Comic Character	Missing 9	Won	
2018	6th APAN Star Awards	Top Excellence Award, Actor in a Miniseries	Life on Mars	Nominated	
2019	12th Korea Drama Awards	Top Excellence Award, Actor	When the Devil Calls Your Name	Nominated	
2020	5th Asia Artist Awards 2020	Popularity Award (Actor)	—N/a	Nominated	
2022	58th Baeksang Arts Awards	Best Actor – Theater	Angels In America	Nominated	
2023	59th Baeksang Arts Awards	Best Actor – Television	Crash Course in Romance	Nominated	
2023	Brand Customer Loyalty Awards	Best Actor – Drama	Crash Course in Romance	Won	
2025	2025 MBC Drama Awards	Grand Prize (Daesang)	Oh My Ghost Clients	Nominated	
2025	2025 MBC Drama Awards	Best Actor Award, Actor	Oh My Ghost Clients	Won	

=== Listicles ===
Name of publisher, year listed, name of listicle, and placement
Publisher	Year	Listicle	Placement	Ref.
Korean Film Council	2021	Korean Actors 200 (Note: Introduces 200 actors that best represent the present and future of Korean cinema to the people in the film industry all over the world.)	Included	
