= Gangster High =

- Hangul: 폭력써클
- Hanja: 暴力써클
- RR: Pongnyeok sseokeul
- MR: P'ongnyŏk ssŏk'ŭl
- Directed by: Park Ki-hyung
- Written by: Park Ki-hyung
- Produced by: Chung Tae-won; Moon Woo-seong; Jo Hyeon-jun
- Starring: Jung Kyung-ho; Lee Tae-sung; Jang Hee-jin; Cho Jin-woong; Kim Hye-seong; Kim Ye-ryeong; Lee Haeng-seok
- Cinematography: Kim Eung-taek
- Edited by: Kim Sun-min
- Music by: Lee Seung-ill
- Production company: Taewon Entertainment
- Distributed by: Showbox
- Release date: October 19, 2006
- Running time: 101 minutes
- Language: Korean

Gangster High is a 2006 South Korean action film written and directed by Park Ki-hyung.

== Plot ==
In 1991, studious soccer enthusiast Sang-ho creates a soccer club called "Tigers" along with his friends Jae-gu and Chang-bae. Through Jae-gu, he meets an attractive, rebellious girl named Su-hee, who turns out to be Jong-suk's girlfriend, leader of a gang called TNT. The two gangs soon become embroiled in intense and violent conflict. When Jae-gu is killed in a car accident related to a gang fight with Jong-suk, the Tigers decide to avenge him. The two gangs meet in a billiards club, and, despite the pleas of Su-hee, a vicious and brutal fight ensues. Three people end up dying, and the rest permanently damaged, including some of Sang-ho's friends. Sang-ho, being the person who started the fight and the only one to walk away relatively unscathed, is charged with the murder of the three people and is sent to prison, where he reminisces upon the fact that the Tiger soccer club was initially created for the enjoyment of soccer and friendship.

== Release and reception ==
Gangster High opened in South Korea in October, 2006, and premiered at the European Film Market in Germany on February 8, 2007. In the United States, Derek Elley of Variety described it as bleak and violent, but praised it as "well drawn in all its diversity (and with occasional humor) by a good cast." James Mudge of Beyond Hollywood gave it a positive review: "Although its premise may sound overly familiar, Gangster High certainly stands as one of the best teen violence films of recent years, with Park proving that he has not lost his touch when it comes to dealing with tales of troubled youth. Hard-hitting and gripping, it offers a different and arguably more convincing take on the usual themes, and contains enough vicious action to entertain as well as provoke."

The film was distributed in the Netherlands on DVD in 2009 by Splendid Film.
