= When the Devil Calls Your Name =

2019 South Korean television series

- Promotional poster
- Hangul: 악마가 너의 이름을 부를 때
- RR: Angmaga neoui ireumeul bureul ttae
- MR: Angmaga nŏŭi irŭmŭl purŭl ttae
- Genre: Melodrama; Fantasy; Supernatural
- Developed by: Lee Myung-han
- Written by: Noh Hye-young; Go Nae-ri
- Directed by: Min Jin-ki
- Starring: Jung Kyung-ho; Park Sung-woong; Lee Seol; Lee El
- Music by: Kim Joon-seok
- Country of origin: South Korea
- Original language: Korean
- No. of episodes: 16

Production
- Producer: Moon Jeong-su
- Running time: 75 minutes
- Production companies: tvN; The Moon C&M

Original release
- Network: tvN
- Release: July 31 – September 19, 2019

When the Devil Calls Your Name (Korean: 악마가 너의 이름을 부를 때) is a 2019 South Korean television series starring Jung Kyung-ho, Park Sung-woong, Lee Seol and Lee El. It is inspired by Johann Wolfgang von Goethe's work Faust. It aired on tvN from July 31 to September 19, 2019.

== Synopsis ==
The series is about a man who sold his soul to a devil ten years ago to obtain fortune and fame. As his contract is soon to expire, he tries to make a deal with the devil using his life as collateral.

== Cast ==
=== Main ===
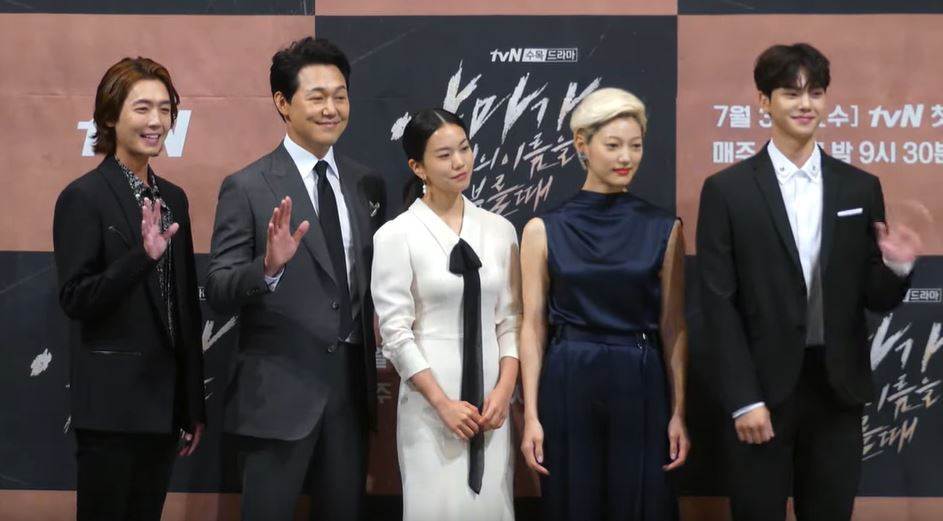
The main cast

- Jung Kyung-ho as Ha Rip / Seo Dong-cheon, a star composer who has sold his soul to a titular devil. He has enjoyed youth and success with numerous hits to his name.
- Park Sung-woong as Mo Tae-gang / Ryu, a top actor who is possessed by the devil Ryu, to whom Ha Rip sold his soul.
  - Nam Da-reum as Ryu's true form
- Lee Seol as Kim I-gyeong, an unsuccessful singer-songwriter who only knows bad luck.
- Lee El as Ji Seo-yeong, the CEO of Soul Entertainment.

=== Supporting ===
- Song Kang as Luka, Ha Rip's rookie assistant.
  - Kim Ye-jun as young Luka
- Yoon Kyung-ho as Mr. Kang, Tae-gang's secretary.
- Nam Ji-hyun (Note: Credited as Son Ji-hyun.) as Yu Dong-hui, I-gyeong's best friend.
- Oh Eui-shik as Kang Ha, Ha Rip's housemate.
- Lee Hwa-kyum (Note: Credited as Lee Yoo-young.) as Joo Ra-in, an idol singer.
- Jung Won-young as Shi-Ho, an idol singer.
- Kim Hyung-mook as Lee Choong-ryeol, co-CEO of Soul Entertainment.
- Kim Won-hae as Kong Soo-rae, a coffeehouse owner and I-gyeong's boss.
- Im Ji-kyu as Kyung-Soo, a police officer and I-gyeong's step brother.
- Choi Yoo-song as Ye Jung-ah, Luka's mother.
- Ryu Hye-rin as Jung Hye-won
- Lee Bong-ryun as a nurse

== Original soundtrack ==
When The Devil Calls Your Name OST

Soundtrack album by Various artists
- Recorded: 2019
- Genre: Soundtrack
- Languages: Korean; English
- Labels: Genie Music; Drama Music
- Producers: Park Sung-il; Ecobridge

=== Special Edition ===
Released on July 25, 2019
No.	Title	Lyrics	Music	Artist	Length
1.	"The Street You Left" (간과 쓸개)	Park Sung-il	Park Sung-il	Liver and Gallbladder	3:17
2.	"The Street You Left" (Inst.)		Park Sung-il		3:17
Total length:					6:34

=== Part 1 ===
Released on July 31, 2019
No.	Title	Lyrics	Music	Artist	Length
1.	"Trap of Love"	Oh Hyun-joo	Park Sung-il	Jung Won-young	2:54
2.	"Trap of Love" (Inst.)		Park Sung-il		2:54
Total length:					5:08

=== Part 2 ===
Released on August 1, 2019
No.	Title	Lyrics	Music	Artist	Length
1.	"When I Am in Busan" (부산에 가면)	Ecobridge	Ecobridge	Jung Kyung-ho	3:35
2.	"When I Am in Busan" (Inst.)		Ecobridge		3:35
Total length:					7:10

=== Part 3 ===
Released on August 7, 2019
No.	Title	Lyrics	Music	Artist	Length
1.	"Talk To Oneself" (혼잣말)	Seo Dong-sung	Park Sung-il	Sondia	4:14
2.	"Talk To Oneself" (Inst.)		Park Sung-il		4:14
Total length:					8:28

=== Part 4 ===
Released on August 8, 2019
No.	Title	Lyrics	Music	Artist	Length
1.	"Where Is The Dream" (꿈은 어디에)	Seo Dong-sung; Ko Nae-ri; Park Sung-il	Park Sung-il	Jung Kyung-ho	3:11
2.	"Where Is The Dream" (Inst.)		Park Sung-il		3:11
Total length:					6:22

=== Part 5 ===
Released on August 15, 2019
No.	Title	Lyrics	Music	Artist	Length
1.	"My Song" (나의 노래)	Seo Dong-sung; Ko Nae-ri; Park Sung-il	Park Sung-il	Sondia	4:13
2.	"My Song" (Inst.)		Park Sung-il		4:13
Total length:					8:26

=== Part 6 ===
Released on August 22, 2019
No.	Title	Lyrics	Music	Artist	Length
1.	"You Bring No Sadness" (그대는 슬픔이 아니다)	Seo Dong-sung; Ko Nae-ri; Park Sung-il	Park Sung-il	Sondia	3:51
2.	"You Bring No Sadness" (Inst.)		Park Sung-il		3:51
Total length:					7:02

=== Part 7 ===
Released on August 29, 2019
No.	Title	Lyrics	Music	Artist	Length
1.	"The Day We Met" (우리가 처음 만난 날)	Seo Dong-sung; Ko Nae-ri; Park Sung-il	Park Sung-il	Sondia	3:35
2.	"The Day We Met" (Inst.)		Park Sung-il		3:35
Total length:					7:10

=== Part 8 ===
Released on September 5, 2019
No.	Title	Lyrics	Music	Artist	Length
1.	"The Street You Left (Live Ver.)" (그대 떠나 없는 거리)	Seo Dong-sung; Ko Nae-ri; Park Sung-il	Park Sung-il	Sondia, Jung Kyung-ho	4:12
2.	"The Street You Left (Live Ver.)" (Inst.)		Park Sung-il		4:12
Total length:					8:24

=== Part 9 ===
Released on September 12, 2019
No.	Title	Lyrics	Music	Artist	Length
1.	"Talk to Oneself (Acoustic Ver.)" (혼잣말 (Acoustic Ver.))	Seo Dong-sung; Ko Nae-ri; Park Sung-il	Park Sung-il	Sondia	2:19
2.	"You Bring No Sadness" (그대는 슬픔이 아니다 (Busking Ver.))	Seo Dong-sung; Ko Nae-ri; Park Sung-il	Park Sung-il	Sondia	3:45
Total length:					6:04

== Production ==
When the Devil Calls Your Name reunites Jung Kyung-ho and Park Sung-woong who previously starred together in Life on Mars (2018). Lee Seol's singing voice was provided by singer Sondia (손디아).

== Viewership ==
When the Devil Calls Your Name : South Korea viewers per episode (thousands)

Season	Episode number															
Season	1	2	3	4	5	6	7	8	9	10	11	12	13	14	15	16
1	882	696	628	558	534	650	508	543	509	374	454	393	282	N/A	374	365

Source: Audience measurement performed nationwide by Nielsen Korea.

Average TV viewership ratings
Ep.	Original broadcast date	Average audience share (Nielsen Korea)	
Ep.	Original broadcast date	Nationwide	Seoul
1	July 31, 2019	3.066%	3.759%
2	August 1, 2019	2.560%	3.264%
3	August 7, 2019	2.530%	3.348%
4	August 8, 2019	2.161%	2.742%
5	August 14, 2019	1.907%	2.465%
6	August 15, 2019	2.120%	2.483%
7	August 21, 2019	1.937%	2.207%
8	August 22, 2019	2.087%	2.632%
9	August 28, 2019	2.037%	2.517%
10	August 29, 2019	1.613%	1.919%
11	September 4, 2019	1.844%	2.396%
12	September 5, 2019	1.624%	2.135%
13	September 11, 2019	1.369%	1.712%
14	September 12, 2019	0.945%	N/A
15	September 18, 2019	1.581%	1.853%
16	September 19, 2019	1.597%	2.307%
Average		1.936%	— (Note: Due to an unpublished rating, the exact average rating is unknown.)
In the table above, the blue numbers represent the lowest ratings and the red numbers represent the highest ratings.; N/A denotes that the rating is not known.; This series aired on a cable channel/pay TV which normally has a relatively smaller audience compared to free-to-air TV/public broadcasters (KBS, SBS, MBC and EBS).

== Awards and nominations ==
Year	Award	Category	Recipient	Result	Ref.
2019	12th Korea Drama Awards	Top Excellence Award, Actor	Jung Kyung-ho	Nominated	
