= Crash Course in Romance =

2023 South Korean television series

- Promotional poster
- Hangul: 일타 스캔들
- Lit.: One Shot Scandal
- RR: Ilta seukaendeul
- MR: Ilt'a sŭk'aendŭl
- Genre: Romantic comedy
- Written by: Yang Hee-seung
- Directed by: Yoo Je-won
- Starring: Jeon Do-yeon; Jung Kyung-ho
- Music by: Lim Ha-young
- Country of origin: South Korea
- Original language: Korean
- No. of episodes: 16

Production
- Producers: Jo Moon-joo; Jeong Se-mi; Lee Yoo-bin
- Running time: 70 minutes
- Production company: Studio Dragon

Original release
- Network: TVN
- Release: January 14 – March 5, 2023

Crash Course in Romance (Korean: 일타 스캔들) is a 2023 South Korean television series directed by Yoo Je-won, and starring Jeon Do-yeon and Jung Kyung-ho. It aired on tvN from January 14 to March 5, 2023, every Saturday and Sunday at 21:10 (KST) for 16 episodes. It is also available for streaming on Netflix in selected regions.

== Synopsis ==
The series follows the bittersweet relationship between a banchan shop owner whose daughter enters the war of Korea's college entrance exams, and a top hagwon instructor.

== Cast ==
=== Main ===
- Jeon Do-yeon as Nam Haeng-seon
  - Lee Yeon as young Haeng-seon

A former national handball player who now runs a banchan shop. After her mother's death, she gave up her sports career to take care of her young niece and disabled younger brother.

- Jung Kyung-ho as Choi Chi-yeol
  - Kim Min-chul as young Chi-yeol

A celebrity math instructor at The Pride Academy and popular private education institute who suffered an eating disorder. He regularly visits Haeng-seon's shop.

=== Supporting ===
==== People around Haeng-seon ====
- Roh Yoon-seo as Nam Hae-yi
  - Choi So-yool as young Hae-yi

Haeng-seon's adopted daughter and niece who was abandoned by her mother, as well as her sister when she was a child. Hae-yi was raised by Haeng-seon afterwards. She is the class president of Class 2-1 of Woorim High School.

- Oh Eui-shik as Nam Jae-woo

Haeng-seon's younger brother who has Asperger syndrome.

- Lee Bong-ryun as Kim Young-joo

Haeng-seon's friend who works at her shop.

- Kim Mi-kyung as Jung Young-soon

Haeng-seon's mother.

==== People around Chi-yeol ====
- Shin Jae-ha as Ji Dong-hee / Jeong Seong-hyeon

Chi-yeol's manager.

- Kim Da-huin as Jeon Jong-ryeol

Chi-yeol's friend who is a teacher at Woorim High School.

==== People in the apartment ====
- Jang Young-nam as Jang Seo-jin

Seon-jae's mother who is an attorney.

- Lee Chae-min as Lee Seon-jae

Hae-yi's best friend who is a student in Class 2-1 and has a crush on her.

- Kim Tae-jung as Lee Hee-jae

Seon-jae's older brother who gave up higher studies and stays at home.

- Kim Sun-young as Jo Soo-hee

Su-ah's mother who is obsessed with her studies.

- Kang Na-eon as Bang Su-ah

A student at class 2-1 who has a rivalry with Hae-yi.

- Hwang Bo-ra as Lee Mi-ok

Dan-ji's mother.

- Ryu Da-in as Jang Dan-ji

A student at class 2-1, close friend of Hae-yi and Seon-jae.

- Lee Min-jae as Seo Geon-hu

A student in class 2-1 who is an ice hockey athlete. Later, he is diagnosed with a serious shoulder injury and has to stop playing.

==== People in the hagwon ====
- Heo Jeong-do as Kang Joon-sang

The director of The Pride Academy.

- Ji Il-joo as Jin Yi-sang

An instructor at The Pride Academy.

=== Extended ===
- Yoo Jun as Lee Young-min

A student in the intensive class at The Pride Academy who falls from the roof and dies.

- Choi Hee-jin as Young-min's mother
- Lee Do-hye as Jeong Su-hyeon

Chi-yeol's student who dies by suicide.

- Jung Han-seol as Detective Bae

A detective who handles the case of Young-min's death.

- Kim Joon-won as Lee Seung-won

Seon-jae and Hee-jae's father.

=== Special appearances ===
- Yoon Seok-hyun as Song Jun-ho
- Bae Yoon-kyung as Hong Hye-yeon
- Lee Sang-yi as YouTuber "Mr. Popular"
- Bae Hae-sun as Nam Haeng-ja

Hae-yi's biological mother

== Episodes ==
Directed by Yoo Je-won, Crash Course in Romance consists of 16 episodes. Each episode title refers to a mathematical concept.

No.	Title	Original release date	South Korea viewers (millions)
1	"You and I, the Intersection of Two Universes"; Transliteration: "Neowa Na, Du Uju-eui Gyojiphap" (Korean: 너와 나, 두 우주의 교집합)	January 14, 2023	0.971
Choi Chi-yeol is the star instructor at Pride Academy, a premier hagwon in mathematics. Parents line up to secure a seat in his classroom, except for Nam Haeng-seon, a single mother and owner of a banchan shop. She trusts her daughter, Nam Hae-yi, to learn what she needs as a diligent, self-motivated high school student. When Hae-yi expresses interest in extra help in math, Haeng-seon snaps into action. Meanwhile, Chi-yeol and Haeng-seon have become bitter enemies, unaware of each other's names.
2	"Probability of Encountering Your Enemy at Your Worst"; Transliteration: "Wonsureul Winamudarieseo Mannal Hwakryul" (Korean: 원수를 외나무다리에서 만날 확률)	January 15, 2023	1.461
When Chi-yeol is hospitalized for malnutrition, his manager, Dong-hee, searches for better food for him and discovers Nation's Best Banchan. Dong-hee agrees to buy lunch from Nation's Best Banchan and encounters Nam Haeng-seon, the woman he hopes to never see again.
3	"Number of Outcomes Where Dislike Becomes Like"; Transliteration: "Dangshin-eui Maeum-i, Naege Misoji-eun Sungan" (Korean: 당신의 마음이, 내게 미소지은 순간)	January 21, 2023	1.354
Determined to support her daughter's education, Haeng-seon queues daily in front of Pride Academy and helps Chi-yeol recover from malnutrition. However, their mutual dislike remains.
4	"Revolt of the Arithmetic Sequence"; Transliteration: "Dangshin-eui Ondoga, Na-eui Maeum-eul Nok-in Sungan" (Korean: 당신의 온도가, 나의 마음을 녹인 순간)	January 22, 2023	1.819
Enrolling in Chi-yeol's lectures, Hae-yi earns the top mathematics grade at her high school. She also passes the Medical College All Care Class test, making her eligible for it and almost guaranteeing admission to a top medical school. Hae-yi enjoys her good fortune until Haeng-seon hears something shocking.
5	"The Secret Probability Distribution of X and Y"; Transliteration: "X-wa Y-eui Bimil Hwakryul Bunpo" (Korean: X와 Y의 비밀 확률 분포)	January 28, 2023	2.242
Chi-yeol and Haeng-seon agree to exchange talents: he will tutor her daughter Hae-yi while she provides him with two meals a day. They keep the arrangement secret to avoid offending other parents, particularly the mothers.
6	"There Are No Correct Answers in Life, Only Best Answers"; Transliteration: "Insaengen Jeongdab-i Anin Yeoreo Gae-eui Mobeomdaban-i Iss-eul Ppun" (Korean: 인생엔 정답이 아닌 여러 개의 모범답안이 있을 뿐)	January 29, 2023	2.660
Hae-yi ranks first in the September mock test, prompting Haeng-seon to invite Chi-yeol to celebrate. This leads to a jokgu match, during which Chi-yeol injures his wrist.
7	"The Very Average Laws of Attraction"; Transliteration: "Sarange Ppajineun Aju Botong-eui Beopchik" (Korean: 사랑에 빠지는 아주 보통의 법칙)	February 4, 2023	2.433
Hae-yi ranks first in the September mock test, prompting Haeng-seon to invite Chi-yeol to celebrate. This leads to a jokgu match, during which Chi-yeol injures his wrist.
8	"Chance Becomes Fate through Inductive Reasoning"; Transliteration: "Inyeon-i Unmyeong-i Dwineun Gwinapjeok Churon" (Korean: 인연이 운명이 되는 귀납적 추론)	February 5, 2023	3.010
Chi-yeol learns that Haeng-seon is the daughter of a canteen owner who helped him as a student. Moved by her words, he decides to repay Haeng-seon for her mother's kindness. He secretly buys the Nation's Best Banchan building and reduces her rent by half. When Haeng-seon delivers lunch boxes to his office, she discovers he may have a girlfriend.
9	"The Butterfly Effect of Our Relationship"; Transliteration: "Uri Mannam-eui Nabihyogwa" (Korean: 우리 만남의 나비효과)	February 11, 2023	2.505
Chi-yeol and Haeng-seon are caught together in front of her shop by the parents of the All Care Class, exposing their tutoring scheme. When a "one-hit scandal" shakes the Pride Academy community, Haeng-seon is unjustly blamed.
10	"Emotion, the Variable That Alters Relationships"; Transliteration: "Gwangyereul Bakkuneun Gamjeong-iraneun Byeonsu" (Korean: 관계를 바꾸는 감정이라는 변수)	February 12, 2023	3.232
During a math talk show where Haeng-seon attends, guests question Chi-yeol about the scandal, and she is again blamed. Unable to tolerate the criticism of her, Chi-yeol confesses his feelings for her publicly. The criticism shifts from Haeng-seon to Chi-yeol, leading to protests from his students and his forced suspension. He hopes a break will clear his mind. Hae-yi makes a sudden public confession, revealing that Haeng-seon is unmarried and actually her aunt.
11	"The Functional Relationship of Our Love"; Transliteration: "Uri Sarang-eui Gwangyehamsu" (Korean: 우리 사랑의 관계함수)	February 18, 2023	3.076
After Hae-yi's confession, Haeng-seon and Chi-yeol admit their feelings for each other. What began as a scandal evolves into a romance, and Hae-yi finds comfort among her friends at school.
12	"Point of Intersection between Comedy and Tragedy"; Transliteration: "Huigeukgwa Bigeuk-eui Gyochajeom" (Korean: 희극과 비극의 교차점)	February 19, 2023	3.328
Haeng-seon and Chi-yeol have their first fight, and their conflicting schedules prevent reconciliation. Chi-yeol plans a fancy date for Haeng-seon, assisted by Dong-hee, who surprises them during the date. Meanwhile, the students at Pride Academy prepare for midterms.
13	"How We Approach an Unsolvable Conjecture"; Transliteration: "Mijee Daecheohaneun Uri-eui Jase" (Korean: 미제(謎題)에 대처하는 우리의 자세)	February 25, 2023	2.855
The academy schedules a camp to mark Chi-yeol's return. Reluctantly, he is persuaded by Dong-hee to participate, leading to days when he and Haeng-seon barely see each other. Hae-yi struggles with the reading exam and goes missing during midterms.
14	"Find the Unique Solution"; Transliteration: "Ojik Hana-eui Haereul Guhara" (Korean: 오직 하나의 해를 구하라)	February 26, 2023	3.646
After a car accident, Hae-yi is put in a coma. The police suspect self-harm, but Haeng-seon believes there's another explanation. She discovers a strange mark on Hae-yi's hand and, with Chi-yeol, searches for clues until Hae-yi's biological mother suddenly appears.
15	"The Result of Coincidence and Necessity"; Transliteration: "Uyeongwa Pilyeon-eui Gyeolgwagap" (Korean: 우연과 필연의 결과값)	March 4, 2023	3.755
Hae-yi's biological mother acts excessively caring, disturbing everyone. Chi-yeol uncovers the truth about Dong-hee during a visit to his rooftop apartment. When Dong-hee attacks Haeng-seon in Hae-yi's hospital room, Hae-yi makes a shocking decision.
16	"You and I, the Union of Two Universes"; Transliteration: "Neowa Na, Du Uju-eui Hapjiphap" (Korean: 너와 나, 두 우주의 합집합)	March 5, 2023	4.329
Hae-yi's choice makes Haeng-seon uncomfortable, but she decides to respect it and prepares to let her go. However, some time later, Hae-yi continues living with her aunt. On D-day, she performs well on the college entrance exam and celebrates her graduation. Haeng-seon and Chi-yeol work toward a happy future together.

== Production ==
The series marked the third collaboration between director Yoo Je-won and screenwriter Yang Hee-seung after High School King of Savvy (2014) and Oh My Ghost (2015). It was reported that filming began in the summer of 2022, and ended on February 5, 2023.

== Media ==
=== Original soundtrack ===
==== Part 1 ====
Released on January 15, 2023
No.	Title	Lyrics	Music	Artist	Length
1.	"Gypsophila" (안개꽃)	Oh Dong-jun	Oh Dong-jun	Lee Ju-hyuk	3:32
2.	"Gypsophila" (안개꽃; Inst.)		Oh Dong-jun		3:32
Total length:					7:04

==== Part 2 ====
Released on January 22, 2023
No.	Title	Lyrics	Music	Artist	Length
1.	"It's Sunny Today" (오늘은 맑음)	Jung Gu-hyun; Aseul	Jung Gu-hyun	Grass	3:06
2.	"It's Sunny Today" (오늘은 맑음; Inst.)		Jung Gu-hyun		3:06
Total length:					6:12

==== Part 3 ====
Released on January 29, 2023
No.	Title	Lyrics	Music	Artist	Length
1.	"The Opposite Side" (반대편)	Hong Ye-jin	Hong Ye-jin	Lee Juck	4:10
2.	"The Opposite Side" (반대편; Inst.)		Hong Ye-jin		4:10
Total length:					8:20

==== Part 4 ====
Released on February 5, 2023
No.	Title	Lyrics	Music	Artist	Length
1.	"At Night" (간밤에)	Dailog	Dailog; Hen	Giriboy	2:52
2.	"At Night" (간밤에; Inst.)		Dailog; Hen		2:52
Total length:					5:44

==== Part 5 ====
Released on February 12, 2023
No.	Title	Lyrics	Music	Artist	Length
1.	"Alright"	Jin Dong-wook	Jin Dong-wook	Ha Hyun-sang	3:22
2.	"Alright" (Inst.)		Jin Dong-wook		3:22
Total length:					6:44

==== Part 6 ====
Released on February 26, 2023
No.	Title	Lyrics	Music	Artist	Length
1.	"Love Code [1+1=1]"	MaO; Naiv	Naiv	Vincent Blue	3:37
2.	"Love Code [1+1=1]" (Inst.)		Naiv		3:37
Total length:					7:14

=== Tie-in publishing ===
The series' original script was published in two books, each covering eight episodes.

Year	Title		Author	Publisher	Published date	ISBN
Year	English	Korean	Author	Publisher	Published date	ISBN
2023	1ta Scandal: Yang Hee-seung and Yeo Eun-ho's script book 1	일타 스캔들: 양희승·여은호 대본집 1	Yang Hee-seung and Yeo Eun-ho	Wisdom House	April 12, 2023	979-1-1681-2597-1
2023	1ta Scandal: Yang Hee-seung and Yeo Eun-ho's script book 2	일타 스캔들: 양희승·여은호 대본집 2	Yang Hee-seung and Yeo Eun-ho	Wisdom House	April 12, 2023	979-1-1681-2598-8

== Reception ==
=== Viewership ===
Crash Course in Romance : South Korea viewers per episode (millions)

Season	Episode number																Average
Season	1	2	3	4	5	6	7	8	9	10	11	12	13	14	15	16	Average
1	0.971	1.461	1.354	1.819	2.242	2.660	2.433	3.010	2.505	3.232	3.076	3.328	2.855	3.646	3.755	4.329	2.667

Source: Audience measurement performed nationwide by Nielsen Korea.

Average TV viewership ratings
Ep.	Original broadcast date	Average audience share (Nielsen Korea)	
Ep.	Original broadcast date	Nationwide	Seoul
1	January 14, 2023	4.044% (1st)	4.315% (1st)
2	January 15, 2023	5.819% (1st)	6.076% (1st)
3	January 21, 2023	5.038% (1st)	5.253% (1st)
4	January 22, 2023	7.559% (1st)	8.109% (1st)
5	January 28, 2023	9.145% (1st)	10.450% (1st)
6	January 29, 2023	10.978% (1st)	12.030% (1st)
7	February 4, 2023	9.730% (1st)	10.799% (1st)
8	February 5, 2023	11.823% (1st)	13.571% (1st)
9	February 11, 2023	10.409% (1st)	12.106% (1st)
10	February 12, 2023	13.501% (1st)	15.958% (1st)
11	February 18, 2023	12.468% (1st)	14.643% (1st)
12	February 19, 2023	12.997% (1st)	15.159% (1st)
13	February 25, 2023	11.359% (1st)	12.913% (1st)
14	February 26, 2023	14.296% (1st)	16.977% (1st)
15	March 4, 2023	15.507% (1st)	18.405% (1st)
16	March 5, 2023	17.038% (1st)	19.797% (1st)
Average		10.731%	12.285%
In the table above, the blue numbers represent the lowest published ratings and the red numbers represent the highest published ratings.; This series aired on a cable channel/pay TV which normally has a relatively smaller audience compared to free-to-air TV/public broadcasters (KBS, SBS, MBC, and EBS).

=== Ranking ===
During its airing, Crash Course in Romance generated significant buzz in the data world. According to Good Data Corporation, it ranked first with a Topicality share of 23.8% in the Top 10 TV Topicality Ranking in the drama division for four consecutive weeks. In the performer category, the casts were in Top 10. Specifically, in the 1st week of January, Jung Kyung-ho was 1st and Jeon Do-yeon 2nd; the next week they stayed 1st and 2nd, with Roh at 10th. By the 3rd week, Roh Yeon-soo rose to 7th. In the 4th week, Jeon dropped to 3rd, Roh was 8th, and Shin Jae-ha debuted at 14th. The 5th and 6th weeks saw Jung 1st, Jeon 2nd, Roh between 6th and 8th, and Shin moving up to 5th. In the 7th week, Jung fell to 2nd, Jeon to 3rd, Roh 5th, and Shin 6th. By the 8th week, Roh topped the chart, followed by Jung 2nd, Jeon 3rd, and Shin 4th.

In the OTT media service drama rankings, Crash Course in Romance secured the top spot for three consecutive weeks. According to the weekly integrated content ranking chart of Kinolights (February 4–10, 2023), a content viewing and analysis service, the series which first aired on January 14, took the lead among dramas. In the first week of March, the drama rank second, still took lead among dramas.

=== Cultural impact ===
The series influenced Korean fashion. Gmarket and SSG.com announced on March 13, 2023, that the flower-patterned blouse of Nam Haeng-seon (played by Jeon Do-yeon) in the drama was gaining popularity. It was named "Southbound fashion". According to Gmarket sales data, the sales growth rate of retro fashion such as lace/ruffle blouses (67%), chiffon blouses (62%), and printed blouses (92%) was high during the airing of the drama. Pattern/print blouses (20%), jeans (15%), and lace/ruffle blouses (10%) also sold well on SSG.com.

== Accolades ==
=== Awards and nominations ===
Award ceremony	Year	Category	Nominee	Result	Ref.
Baeksang Arts Awards	2023	Best Actor – Television	Jung Kyung-ho	Nominated	
Baeksang Arts Awards	2023	Best New Actress – Television	Roh Yoon-seo	Won	
Brand Customer Loyalty Awards	2023	Best Actor – Drama	Jung Kyung-ho	Won	
Scene Stealer Festival	2023	Scene Stealer of the Year	Hwang Bo-ra	Won	

=== Listicle ===
Publisher	Year	Listicle	Placement	Ref.
Time	2023	The 10 Best Korean Dramas of 2023 on Netflix	Included	
