= Kim C =

South Korean musician

Kim C 김 C
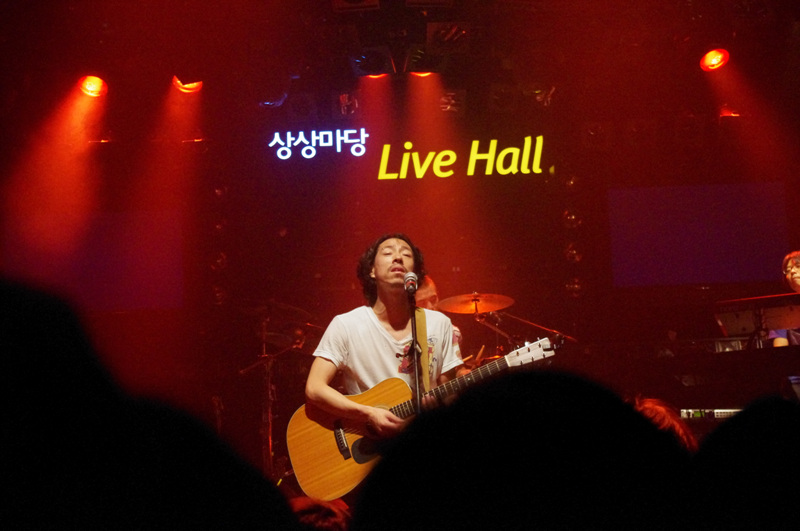
- Kim in 2010

Background information
- Born: Kim Dae-won; November 15, 1971 (age 54); Chuncheon, Gangwon-do
- Origin: South Korea
- Genres: K-pop, indie rock, folk rock
- Occupations: Singer; composer; narrator; songwriter; actor; host
- Instruments: Vocals, guitar
- Years active: 1997–present
- Label: Daeum Entertainment
- Website: ahaba.net

- Kim C
- Hangul: 김대원
- Hanja: 金大元
- RR: Gim Daewon
- MR: Kim Taewŏn

Kim Dae-won (Korean: 김대원; born November 15, 1971), better known by the stage name Kim C (김C), is a South Korean singer from Hot Potato and an entertainer.

== Personal life ==
He is divorced and has a daughter, named Kim Yu-ju (김유주, born 2004) and a son. He currently serves as a catcher of entertainment baseball club, Han (한, 恨). Moreover, he commentates several professional football matches as a maniatic perspective, when the national team plays, including 2006 World Cup and 2008 Beijing Olympics.

== Career ==
During his early years as a Chuncheon High School student, he played baseball as an outfielder of the school's semi-professional team. After graduation, with strong suggestion from Korean pop singer, his friend Yoon Do-hyun (lead singer of YB), and bassist Ko Beum-jun, he started his musical career in 1997, with a creation of a band called 'Hot Potato' (뜨거운 감자).

His popularity has increased, since April 2006, he joined the guest of the Friday-night popular music variety programme, Yoon Do-hyun's Love Letter, hosting a segment called Making a gorgeous world with 'slanting' Kim C (삐딱이 김C와 아름다운 세상 만들기, ~ May 2007) on KBS2. Since then, he appeared in a wide range of Korean television programs from variety show to documentaries. Previously, he quoted about his frequent media appearances that, the reason why he acts in such variety shows is to advertise his music.

Although, as a singer, some of his songs reached 1st in the Korean pop charts. Kim plays the guitar and has a deep, classical singing voice. His memorable songs to the public are "Don't Worry Yohey!" (걱정마 Yohey!), "Lady Away Following Spring Blows" (봄바람 따라간 여인), and most recently with "Rain Tears" (비 눈물).

Since October 2007, he appeared on the KBS2's Happy Sunday: 1 Night 2 Days (1박2일) as one of the regular cast members, himself replacing Ji Sang Ryul. In his first episode, while stuck with no money and food, Kim, together with ballad singer Lee Seung-gi with the host Kang Ho-dong sang and played the guitar, earning about ₩8,866. Kim C is also known for his unique style of playing guitars and writing several lyrics.

Kim C was well loved as a quiet and rational character in '1 Night 2 Days'. While he wasn't a master in variety like the other cast members, he showed himself to be the physical agile and intelligent member of the cast, helping them complete various missions which seemed impossible at times, including Bungee Jumping. Kim is also perceived as the "Master" in being able to eat various foods that the rest of the cast can't eat. Kim C confirmed that he would be leaving the show in May 2010, after nearly 3 years of joining 1 Night 2 Days. This news came after there has been speculations of him leaving the show earlier.

As for the reasons of leaving the show, it has been revealed that Kim C will be going overseas to further his studies in Berlin for at least a year. He later confirmed in 2014 that he had stayed there for 15 months. The last filming of the show was completed in KyeongBok KyeongJoo for the Student Trip Special. During this time, the other 1 Night 2 Days Cast like members Kang HoDong, Lee SooGeun, Lee SeungGi, MC Mong, Eun JiWon and Kim JongMin bade him farewell and presented him with a mosaic as a gift. Kim C had confirmed that he had voiced his intentions to leave the show 6 months prior, but never informed the rest of the cast until 2 days before the filming to not disrupt the usual filming patterns of the show. Kim C's agency representative voiced, "We talked about him going abroad for his studies before. But we did not know about him leaving 2Days 1Night. We are still discussing the details with KBS." There were also new reports that there are no plans for the show to add one more member after Kim C leaves. After Kim C's departure, he remained to narrate for the show for a few episodes in 2010 before leaving overseas.

Meanwhile, Kim C released a movie soundtrack ‘See Saw’ as part of band Hot Potato which is well received by music fans. Kim C also has his own Radio Show, named "Kim C's Music Show", which broadcasts on KBS Cool FM every day from 4:00 to 6:00 pm. Notable guests have included Jo in Sung, Gong HyoJin and Lee Hyori. Kim C started hosting in 2013 and stayed on the show for only a year.

Kim C also appeared in various variety shows, including We Got Married (Where he made a cameo during the Cho Jung Chi- Jung in Arc) and Infinity Challenge Music Festival 2013 (Where he partnered with Jung Jun Ha to form the duo "Double Play". He composed and later performed the song "Will be Gone" featuring Lee Sora and rapper Beenzino with Jung). In recent times, Kim C has concentrated to electronic music as well as his forte in K-indie music.

As of 2016, Kim C continues to release music through Hot Potato and his SoundCloud page. He is also the new host for a travel variety show on MBN, 여행생활자 집시맨

== Hot Potato discography ==
Volume 1 – NAVI

- Released: December 22, 2000
- Tracks:
1. 럭비공
2. 무언
3. 여의도의 꽃들은 좋겠네
4. 철수의 일기
5. 진공 아리랑
6. 13월
7. 일
8. 오늘 난 뭐했나?
9. 내 꿈에 관한 짧은 얘기
10. Time
11. 고현정

Volume 2 – New Turn

- Released: June 13, 2003
- Tracks:
1. 맛좀봐라
2. 풋사과
3. 걱정마 Yohey!
4. U Turn
5. Irony
6. 잡담
7. 몰라, 정말몰라
8. 서울 기러기
9. 난 나를 사랑할줄 몰랐습니다
10. Bless Me

Volume 3 – 年記 (Yearly Diary)

- Released: March 21, 2006
- Tracks:
1. Today Is
2. 봄바람 따라간 여인
3. 강변북로를 걷는 여자
4. 좌절금지
5. 101동 111호
6. 청춘
7. 구름
8. Perfect Loser
9. Question
10. 미안해
11. 각설탕
12. 내가 날아간 자리
13. Hidden Track

Volume 4 – The Journey Of Cultivating A Potato Field (감자밭을 일구는 여정)

- Released: September 25, 2008
- Tracks:
1. 따르릉
2. 도마뱀 (Lizard)
3. 비 눈물 (Rain Tears)
4. 생각 (Thought)
5. 수학이 좋다 (Good Mathematics)
6. 소라를 줍는 여정
7. 미신 (Superstition)
8. 못생긴 소년
9. Knock
10. 코메디 (Comedy)

Volume 5 – Seesaw OST

- Released: March 30, 2010
- Label: Daeum Entertainment, Universal Music
- Tracks:
1. 시소 Main Theme (Seesaw Main Theme)
2. 진취적인 그녀
3. 고백 (Confession)
4. M Theme
5. 빈방
6. 시소 (Seesaw)
7. W Theme
8. 시소 Nylon Version (Seesaw Nylon Version)
9. Clock Quartet
10. Passing over the Rainbow

== Media appearances ==
=== Variety show ===
- 2005–2006: KBS1 Young Story (청년불패) (July 9–15)
- 2007–2010: KBS2 Happy Sunday: 1 Night 2 Days (1박2일)
- 2008–2009: SBS 대한민국 국민고시
- 2009: KBS2 Invincible Saturday: Invincible Baseball Team (천하무적 토요일: 천하무적 야구단)
- 2012: KBS2 Do Dream(이야기쇼 두드림) (Co-host from episodes 23 to 64)
- 2013–2014: MBC Infinite Challenge (무한도전) (Various cameos)
- 2016–present: MBN 여행생활자 집시맨 (Host)

=== Drama ===
- 2005: MBC Can Love Be Refilled?
- 2006: MBC Rainbow Romance
- 2006: MBC MBC Best Theater – How Are You, Youth?
- 2006: Mnet Fallen Angel Jenny
- 2007: MBC MBC Best Theater – Romance Papa
- 2012: tvN Flower Band

=== Movie ===
- 2004: 만남 (Production)
- 2004: 나스카 카레이싱 3D (Narrator)
- 2005: 거칠마루 (Narrator)
- 2007: For Eternal Hearts (Music)
- 2008: 오이시맨 (Oishi Man) (Production)
- 2008: 정글 피쉬 (Jungle Fish) (Actor)
- 2009: 애자 (Actor)

=== Theater ===
- 2010: 사나이 와타나베, 완전히 삐지다 (Actor)

=== Radio ===
- 2003–2004: MBC FM4U Music Salon with Kim C
- 2004: SBS-AM 월드컵 플러스
- 2004–2005: MBC FM4U Kim C's Style
- 2006–2007: SBS 김C의 멋진아침
- 2013– 2014: KBS2 Danny Ahn & Kim C's Music Show (Now Changed to Kim C's Music Show)
- OCN's Zoom In

=== Documentary ===
- 2005–present: KBS1 걸어서 세계속으로 (Narrator)
- 2008–2009: SBS 대한민국 국민고시 (Judge/panel)
- 2010: SBS 당신이 궁금한 그 이야기 – 큐브 Cube (Storyteller)

=== Book ===
- 2006: 날아다니는 김C의 휴지통 비우기 (February 20)
