= For Eternal Hearts =

- Theatrical poster
- Hangul: 별빛 속으로
- RR: Byeolbit sogeuro
- MR: Pyŏlpit sogŭro
- Directed by: Hwang Qu-duk
- Written by: Hwang Qu-duk
- Produced by: David Cho; Jo Eun-un; Hwang Qu-duk
- Starring: Jung Kyung-ho; Kim Min-sun; Cha Soo-yeon
- Cinematography: Ko Myeong-woo
- Edited by: Kim Sang-bum
- Music by: Go Byeong-jun; Kim C
- Distributed by: Sponge Entertainment
- Release date: August 9, 2007
- Running time: 103 minutes
- Country: South Korea
- Language: Korean
- Box office: $45,398

For Eternal Hearts (Korean: 별빛 속으로) is a 2007 South Korean supernatural romantic drama film written and directed by Hwang Qu-duk.

== Plot ==
College professor Su-young recounts to his class the tale of his first love. As a student in the 1980s, he meets a wild and eccentric girl who he names "Pippi", and is crushed when she later jumps to her death from a window. But soon after she magically reappears, and his life becomes increasingly surreal and bizarre.

== Cast ==
- Jung Kyung-ho as Su-young (student)
- Jung Jin-young as Su-young (professor)
- Kim Min-sun as Pippi
- Cha Soo-yeon as Su-ji
- Kim C
- Jang Hang-sun
- Lee Soo-na
- Song Seung-hwan

== Release ==
For Eternal Hearts premiered as the opening film of the 11th Puchon International Fantastic Film Festival, held from July 12 to 21, 2007. From August 9, 2007 it was given a limited theatrical release in South Korea at independent theatre chain Spongehouse, where it received a total of 6,724 admissions nationwide and grossed (as of September 16, 2007) US$45,398. The film was later invited to the "Winds of Asia" category of the Tokyo International Film Festival, which opened on October 20, 2007.
