= Kim Tae-jung (actor) =

South Korean actor (born 1999)

- Born: January 21, 1999 (age 26); Yeongwol, South Korea
- Occupation: Actor
- Years active: 2019–present
- Agent: Kiul Company

Korean name
- Hangul: 김태정
- RR: Gim Taejeong
- MR: Kim T'aejŏng

Kim Tae-jung (Korean: 김태정; born January 21, 1999) is a South Korean actor under Kiul Company. He made his acting debut in Extraordinary You (2019), and has been active in various works, such as Crash Course in Romance (2023), the BL web drama Tinted with You (2021–2022), and Like Flowers in Sand (2023–2024).

== Early life ==
Kim was born on January 21, 1999, in Yeongwol, South Korea. His father is Kim Jae-joo, a public prosecutor who is working at Chuncheon District Prosecutors' Office, and his mother is Jeong Yeong-hee, who works at Yeongwol Health Center.

== Career ==
On March 8, 2024, Kim had signed an exclusive contract with Kiul Company, a subsidiary of comprehensive entertainment company Y1 Entertainment.

== Filmography ==
=== Television series ===
Year	Title	Role	Note(s)	Ref.
2019	Extraordinary You	Chae Yook-in	Acting debut	
2022	Seasons of Blossom	Park Chang-hyun		
2023	Crash Course in Romance	Lee Hee-jae		
2023–2024	Like Flowers in Sand	Lim Dong-seok		
2024	Chief Detective 1958	Kwon Hyung-geun		
2024	Hierarchy	Choi Yoon-seok		
2024	Good Partner	Lee Seung-jun	Special appearance (Ep.11)	
2024	Cinderella at 2 AM	Ha Ji-suk		
2025	Law and the City	Jang Soo-gil	Special appearance	
2025	Queen Mantis	Choi Hyuk		
2026	No Tail to Tell	Hwang Chi-soo		

=== Web series ===
Year	Title	Role	Ref.
2021	Tinted with You	Geum	
