= Cho Nam-joo =

South Korean writer and author (born 1978)

- 조남주
- Born: 1978 (age 47–48); South Korea
- Education: Ewha Womans University
- Occupation: Writer
- Notable work: Kim Ji-Young, Born 1982 (2016)

Cho Nam-joo (Korean: 조남주, born 1978) is a South Korean writer and author. She is known for her 2016 novel Kim Ji-young, Born 1982, which has sold more than a million copies and is often credited with propelling the feminist movement in South Korea.

== Early life ==
Cho was born in 1978. She grew up in Bucheon and moved to Seoul with her family at age five. During her mother's pregnancy, Cho's father promised her uncle —who had five daughters— that if the baby was born a boy, he would gift the child to the uncle to raise. Ultimately, she was raised by her own parents.

As a child, Cho loved reading, but she didn't have money for books, and the local public libraries in the poor outskirts of Seoul where she lived were barely functioning. She borrowed the few books she could and reread those stories again and again.

Cho attended all-girls' schools for middle school, high school, and college. She graduated from Ewha Womans University with a degree in sociology.

== Career ==
Cho began her career in television as a scriptwriter. She spent nearly a decade as a writer for TV programs about current events at a broadcasting station. She left work to raise her child, then returned as a writer. She wrote two novels before her hit book, Kim Ji-Young, Born 1982 was published in 2016. By 2023, she has published or signed for 10 books.

=== Kim Ji-Young, Born 1982 ===
Cho published her third novel, Kim Ji-Young, Born 1982, in 2016. Originally written in Korean, it has been translated into more than 18 languages and sold more than one million copies. Cho wrote the novel in 2015 within a span of three months.

Its publication in 2016 coincided with South Korea's #MeToo Movement, prompting a feminist reckoning and an urgent nationwide debate about gender inequality. The book was described as a work of cultural "reportage" and a "social treatise."

The book portrays an average Korean woman from childhood and through career and motherhood—the name Kim Ji-Young is the Korean equivalent of Jane Smith. It is the story of a 33-year-old stay-at-home mother who is driven to a psychotic break by misogyny and expectations on motherhood in Korean culture. The book is filled with footnoted statistics that reveal real gender inequalities in South Korea.

A film adaptation of Kim Ji-Young, Born 1982, featuring actress Jung Yu-mi in the titular role, was released in Korea in 2019 to critical acclaim.

== Personal life ==
As of 2017, Cho has one daughter.
