= Fasten Your Seatbelt (film) =

- Theatrical release poster
- Hangul: 롤러코스터
- RR: Rolleokoseuteo
- MR: Rollŏk'osŭt'ŏ
- Directed by: Ha Jung-woo
- Written by: Ha Jung-woo
- Produced by: Kim Han-gil
- Starring: Jung Kyung-ho
- Cinematography: So Jung-oh
- Edited by: Kim Woo-il
- Music by: Kim Jung-bum
- Production company: Fantagio Pictures
- Distributed by: CJ Entertainment
- Release dates: October 5, 2013 (Busan International Film Festival); October 17, 2013 (South Korea)
- Running time: 94 minutes
- Country: South Korea
- Language: Korean
- Budget: US$590,000
- Box office: US$1,755,894

Fasten Your Seatbelt (Korean: 롤러코스터; RR: Rolleokoseuteo; lit. 'Rollercoaster') is a 2013 South Korean comedy film written and directed by actor Ha Jung-woo, in his directorial debut. The film made its world premiere at the 18th Busan International Film Festival, and was released in theaters on October 17, 2013.

== Plot ==
A plane headed from Tokyo's Haneda Airport to Seoul's Gimpo Airport with a Hallyu star on board runs into an unexpected storm and is in danger of crashing. A plane full of absurd characters―both crew members and passengers such as a businessman, a monk and a paparazzi—go through a series of comical shenanigans.

== Cast ==
- Jung Kyung-ho as Ma Joon-gyu
- Ha Sung-chun as Han Gi-beom, captain
- Kim Jae-hwa as Kim Hwal-ran, head stewardess
- Choi Kyu-hwan as Kim Hyeon-gi, tabloid reporter
- Kim Gi-cheon as Heo Seung-bok, Zha Cai Airlines chairman
- Kim Byeong-ok as monk
- Kang Shin-chul as Kang Shin-choo, chief purser
- Kim Sung-kyun as Jo-rong, steward
- Ko Sung-hee as Minamito, Japanese stewardess
- Kim Ye-rang as Chan-mi, stewardess
- Lee Ji-hoon as ophthalmologist
- Son Hwa-ryung as Chun-nyeo, chairman's executive assistant
- Hwang Jung-min as Cha Bok-soon, middle-aged female fan
- Im Hyun-sung as co-pilot
- Kang Han-na
- Kim Joon-kyu
- Lee Soo-in
- Kim Jae-young
- Ko Kyu-pil as Ma Joon-gyu's manager

== Production ==
Ha Jung-woo said he had always had the desire to study about film more, so he seized the opportunity to approach this movie not as an actor but as a director. "Having pondered what kind of film I should make, I came to the conclusion that I would only be satisfied if the audience could enjoy it and get some laughs. This naturally led me to write a comedy," Ha said.

Ha reportedly wrote the script based on his friend and fellow actor Ryoo Seung-bum's real-life experience. The flight from Seoul to Tokyo usually only takes about two hours, but Ryoo once experienced plane turbulence that went on for almost seven hours, during which he genuinely thought he was going to die.

Ha cast Jung Kyung-ho in the leading role as an arrogant and paranoid Hallyu star. Ha and Jung belong to the same agency Fantagio, and were both theater majors at Chung-Ang University. This was Jung's first acting job after his discharge from mandatory military service, and his character's appearance and wardrobe was inspired by K-pop star G-Dragon. Most of the actors in the cast have also worked with Ha before—even the music director, a colleague he first met while working on My Dear Enemy in 2008.

The film was shot in 20 days, and producer Kwon Nam-jin described Ha as a director who makes "quick and rational decisions" while making the atmosphere on the set bright and funny. In order to build a strong ensemble, one of Ha's casting conditions was to read the screenplay every day with the entire cast for two months, conducting intensive rehearsals as if they were preparing for a stage play.

== Box office ==
Though ultimately not a big hit, due to its low budget Fasten Your Seatbelt broke even in just four days, attracting 200,000 viewers in the first six days of its release.

== Awards and nominations ==
| Year | Award | Category | Recipients | Result | Ref. |
|---|---|---|---|---|---|
| 2014 | 9th Osaka Asian Film Festival | Grand Prix Award | Ha Jung-woo | Nominated | |
| 2014 | 9th Osaka Asian Film Festival | Most Promising Talent | Ha Jung-woo | Won | |
| 2014 | 50th Baeksang Arts Awards | Best New Director | Ha Jung-woo | Nominated | |
| 2014 | 34th Golden Cinema Festival | Best New Actor | Jung Kyung-ho | Won | |
