= Kim Ji-young, Born 1982 =

2016 novel by Cho Nam-joo

- First edition (Korean)
- Author: Cho Nam-Joo
- Language: Korean
- Genre: Novel
- Publisher: Minumsa
- Publication date: October 2016
- Publication place: South Korea
- Media type: Hardcover
- Pages: 192
- ISBN: 9789864892655

Kim Ji-young, Born 1982 (Korean: 82년생 김지영) is a novel by Cho Nam-Joo. A former scriptwriter for TV programs, Cho took two months to write the story as according to her, the title character "Kim Ji-young's life isn't much different from the one I have lived. That's why I was able to write so quickly without much preparation." Published by Minumsa in October 2016, it has sold more than 1 million copies as of 27 November 2018, becoming the first million-selling Korean novel since Shin Kyung-sook's Please Look After Mom in 2009.

The storyline centers on a housewife who becomes a stay-at-home mother and later develops depression. It focuses on the everyday sexism the title character experiences from youth.

== Internal division ==
The book has six chapters, each one narrating a different stage in Kim Jiyoung's life. The stages are as follows:

- Autumn, 2015
- Childhood, 1982–1994
- Adolescence, 1995–2000
- Early Adulthood, 2001–2011
- Marriage, 2012–2015
- 2016

== Plot ==
The novel opens with a young South Korean woman experiencing a strange problem, Kim Jiyoung is fully impersonating other women she knows, and does not seem self-aware of the fact. Her husband is concerned and she is taken in to get psychiatric help.

The narrative then backtracks, and tells us the story of the life of Kim Jiyoung including a short family history, her birth, growing up and an adult life. The book presents not only the ordinary but trying hardships the eponymous character had to go through from her early childhood, but also covers the experiences of other women that she knew. It shows the discrimination and social judgement the women faced, their thoughts and feelings on it, and how they responded.

Kim Jiyoung is the second daughter of a family with two daughters and one son, the youngest. A key theme is the strong preference for sons in her society, which touches and affects even those who personally do not strongly agree with the prejudice. Jiyoung’s mother felt under strong pressure to have a son from her in-laws, and so kept having children until she had a son. She also tacitly allows those around her to privilege her son at the expense of herself and her daughters, while disagreeing with this custom whenever she becomes more consciously aware of it. The mother-daughter relationship is explored in depth in this book, as is the relationships between mothers and fathers, and among siblings.

Jiyoung does well at school despite stress in her home over finances, harassment by a boy playing “pranks” on her and an incident of stalking she faces while going to and from cram-school. She dreams of becoming a journalist at first, but then her interests turn to marketing while in college and she follows that career path. While she struggles to get any employment at the end of college she becomes more and more aware of the difference in how male students exactly like herself, or less qualified, are being encouraged, supported and hired while she and her fellow female students are lucky to trade down for lesser roles and get jobs in their field at all. Just before graduation she does manage to find employment and takes to it, relatively happy with the outcome. Work becomes important to her and she finds a female mentor among the upper level professionals there who takes her under her wing and is doing her best to make the workplace better for women than it was when she first started.

After a series of relationships, Jiyoung marries. Much about her new husband and their life together is good. The one main issue is his extended family put a lot of pressure on them to have a child, a son specifically, and her husband does not defend her from their pushing. Following an argument, he apologizes fully and says he will stand up for her. But then he also gives his opinion that they will not stop pushing, and they both do intend to have a child someday, so why not now? Jiyoung feels stifled by this idea, and afraid they will not be able to support her career and the child without neglecting the child or leading to her quitting. Later she comes around to the idea of having a child and leaving her work, at least temporarily, but is unsettled by her husband’s attitude that what he promises to do for her is “helping out” rather than doing work he is equally responsible for, and does not represent an equivalent to her sacrifices.

But she does become pregnant, and so a major change comes in Jiyoung’s life. She leaves her work, experiences a difficult birth, but gives birth to a daughter. She commits to being a housewife for now.

Later she endures ridicule for being a “roach” and freeloader as a stay-at-home mom from young career men who witness her daring to enjoy a small break with her baby in the park, and is told off by her doctor for having it easier than women “in his day” and still complaining of stress. This occurs directly before she begins manifesting her symptoms of mental illness.

The narrative switches near the end of the novel to the point of view of a man, who describes himself as Kim Jiyoung’s psychiatrist and relates how Jiyoung’s reflections and that of her husband informed the preceding narrative of her life. He describes his views on her case, sounding very sympathetic and aware of her situation being abused for being a woman and the toll it has taken on her, combined with potential postpartum depression.

He then cites the influence of his wife in teaching him to be aware of all this. He digresses to tell the story of some incidents around their home, including the stress of his misbehaving son and his wife’s resentment at his lack of engagement as a parent. He admits she is right but does not say he intends to change. He then relays an incident where he finds his wife, a math prodigy turned stay-at-home mother, doing elementary math work books for fun. She says to him that it is all she can control anymore. He is confused and repulsed by this and insists it cannot be fun, and that she should not settle in life. The narrative ends with his attempted feminist reflections turning back to his own office, where a female employee is resigning because she is pregnant. Ironically, for a man who claims to understand Kim Jiyoung and care for her plight, he notes that he will have to be sure to hire an unmarried woman so he doesn’t face this same inconvenience again.

== Feminism ==
Cho Nam-Joo says that it was her intention to "make this into a public debate".

"I thought of Kim Jiyoung's character as a vessel that contains experiences and emotions that are common to every Korean woman."

— Cho Nam-Joo

She stresses that the hardships the Korean women have to go through need to be discussed publicly and the sexual harassments and discrimination they encounter should be taken seriously. Kim Jiyoung is not entirely fictional as it contains statistical data "so that its message wouldn’t be dismissed as a made-up account of one woman’s experience". Cho collected the sources she needed and finished a book within 2 months. Her wish of evoking a public debate came true. The book turned out to be an international bestseller and in 2018 it became a part of the feminist campaign in South Korea as well as the "Escape the Corset" and #MeToo movements. It also inspired the 4B movement. According to Cho Nam-Joo, the Korean women still experience sexual abuse and inequality but not as often as they did in the past. Since they started to protest and speak up the situation began to change, though very slowly. Cho also said she believed the situation of women would not get any worse.

== Reception ==
The book gained attention in early 2017 after readers posted reviews of the book on social media. In May 2018, after the floor leader of the Justice Party's Roh Hoe-chan gifted the book to President Moon Jae-in with a message that read "Please embrace 'Kim Ji-young Born '82'", the book's sales shot up. It has sold more than 1 million copies as of November 2018. But despite the novel's popularity and timely message on sexism in Korea, controversy still arose when Red Velvet member Irene shared during a fan meet that she had read Kim Ji-Young. Male fans began berating the K-pop idol, going as far as burning and cutting up Irene's photos. Among the celebrities who appreciated the book were also: RM of BTS, Soo-young of Girls’ Generation and Yui Yokoyama of AKB48.

In 2020, the novel became longlisted for the U.S. National Book Award for Translated Literature and the French Emile Guimet Prize for Asian Literature.

== Film adaptation ==
In 2019, the book was adapted into a film with Jung Yu-mi and Gong Yoo taking the lead roles.
