= History of the United States (1945–1964) =

The United States of America — Post–World War II Era
- 1945–1964
History of the United States (1917–1945), World War II	History of the United States (1964–1980)
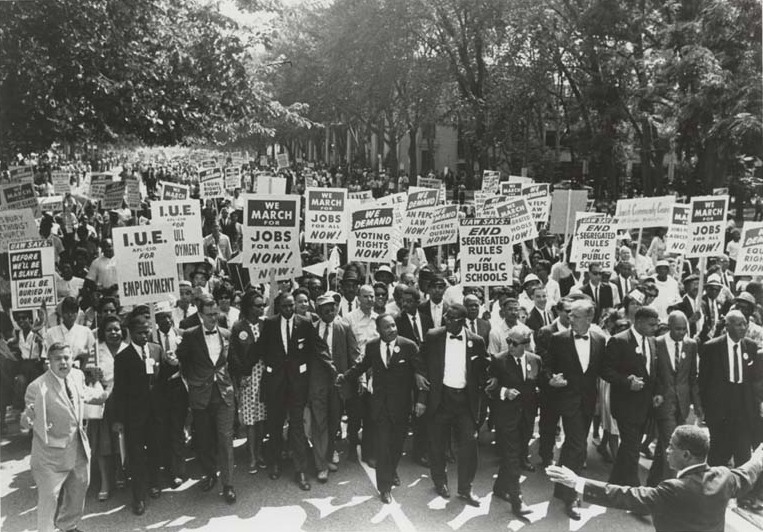
- Martin Luther King, Jr. leads civil rights protestors during the March on Washington for Jobs and Freedom, August 28, 1963. The 1950s and 1960s were a time of major social and political changes in the United States.
- Location: United States
- Including: New Deal Era; Early Cold War; Third Industrial Revolution; Migrations: Second Great Migration; Great Plains Exodus; Appalachian migration
- President(s): Franklin D. Roosevelt; Harry S. Truman; Dwight D. Eisenhower; John F. Kennedy; Lyndon B. Johnson
- Key events: Strike wave of 1945–1946; Formation of NATO; Korean War; Second Red Scare; Lavender Scare; Civil Rights movement Postwar economic expansion Cuban Missile Crisis; Assassination of John F. Kennedy; Great Society; Vietnam War

The history of the United States from 1945 to 1964 was a time of high economic growth and general prosperity. It was also a time of confrontation as the capitalist United States and its allies politically opposed the Soviet Union and other communist states; the Cold War had begun. African Americans united and organized, and a triumph of the civil rights movement ended Jim Crow segregation in the Southern United States. Further laws were passed that made discrimination illegal and provided federal oversight to guarantee voting rights.

In the period, an active foreign policy was pursued to help Western Europe and Asia recover from the devastation of World War II. The Marshall Plan helped Western Europe rebuild from wartime devastation. The main American goal was the Containment of communism. An arms race escalated through increasingly powerful nuclear weapons. The Soviets formed the Warsaw Pact of European satellites to oppose the American-led North Atlantic Treaty Organization (NATO) alliance. The U.S. fought a bloody, inconclusive war in Korea and was escalating the war in Vietnam as the period ended. Fidel Castro took power in Cuba, and when the USSR sent in nuclear missiles to defend it, the Cuban Missile Crisis of 1962 was triggered with the U.S., the most dangerous point of the era.

On the domestic front, after a short transition, the economy grew rapidly, with widespread prosperity, rising wages, and the movement of most of the remaining farmers to the towns and cities. Politically, the era was dominated by liberal Democrats who held together with the New Deal Coalition: Franklin D. Roosevelt (1933–1945), Harry S. Truman (1945–1953), John F. Kennedy (1961–1963) and Lyndon Johnson (1963–1969). Republican Dwight D. Eisenhower (1953–1961) was a moderate who did not attempt to reverse New Deal programs such as regulation of business and support for labor unions; he expanded Social Security and built the interstate highway system. For most of the period, the Democrats controlled Congress; however, they were usually unable to pass as much liberal legislation as they had hoped because of the power of the Conservative Coalition. The Liberal coalition took control of Congress after Kennedy's assassination in 1963, and launched the Great Society.

This period of Post–World War II economic expansion witnessed the rapid growth of suburbs and a growing middle class.

== Cold War ==
The Cold War (1945–1991) was the continuing state of political conflict, military tension, and economic competition between the Soviet Union and its satellite states, and the powers of the Western world, led by the United States. Although the primary participants' military forces never officially clashed directly, they expressed the conflict through military coalitions, strategic conventional force deployments, a nuclear arms race, espionage, proxy wars, propaganda, and technological competition, e.g., the Space Race.

=== Origins ===
While the United States and Soviet Union remained Allies throughout World War II, diplomatic relations were nonetheless tense. The Western Allies feared that the Soviet Union would establish hegemony over the territories it had seized from Germany on the Eastern Front. President Roosevelt believed that the countries liberated from the Axis Powers should be given self-determination to choose their own governments; at the Yalta Conference in February 1945, the Western Allied leaders pressed Soviet leader Joseph Stalin to allow Soviet-occupied countries to hold elections. Meanwhile, Stalin's insistences that the Soviet Union expand its borders westward increased the suspicions of the Western Allies. The Soviet Union did not withdraw from Eastern Europe after the war was over, and established its own puppet governments in the territory it had occupied.

Post-war territorial changes in Europe and the formation of the Eastern Bloc, the western border is the "Iron Curtain".

While Roosevelt was confident he could cooperate with Stalin after the war, Truman was much more suspicious. The United States provided large-scale grants to Western Europe under the Marshall Plan (1948–1951), leading to a rapid economic recovery. The Soviet Union refused to allow its satellites to receive American aid. Instead, the Kremlin used local communist parties, and the Red Army, to control Eastern Europe in totalitarian fashion. Britain, in deep financial trouble, could no longer support Greece in its civil war with the communists. It asked the United States to take over aid to Greece. With bipartisan support in Congress, Truman responded with the Truman Doctrine in 1947. Truman followed the intellectual leadership of the State Department, which called for containment of Soviet communist expansion. The hope was that internal contradictions, such as diverse nationalism, would ultimately undermine Soviet ambitions.

By 1947, the Soviets had fully absorbed the three Baltic nations, and effectively controlled Poland, East Germany, Czechoslovakia, Romania, and Bulgaria. Austria and Finland were neutral and demilitarized. The Kremlin did not control Yugoslavia, which had a separate communist regime under Marshall Tito; They had a permanent bitter break in 1948. The Cold War lines stabilized in Europe along the Iron Curtain, and there was no fighting. The United States helped form a strong military alliance in NATO in 1949 including most of the nations of Western Europe, and Canada. In Asia, however, there was much more movement. The United States failed to negotiate a settlement between its ally, nationalist China under Chiang Kai-shek, and the communists under Mao Zedong. The communists took over China in 1949 and the nationalist government moved to the offshore island of Formosa (Taiwan), which came under American protection. Local communist movements attempted to take over all of Korea (1950) and Vietnam (1954). Communist hegemony covered one third of the world's land while the United States emerged as the world's more influential superpower, and formed a worldwide network of military alliances.

There were fundamental contrasts between the visions of the United States and the Soviet Union, between capitalist democracy and totalitarian communism. The United States envisioned the new United Nations as a Wilsonian tool to resolve future troubles, but it failed in that purpose. The U.S. rejected totalitarianism and colonialism, in line with the principles laid down by the Atlantic Charter of 1941: self-determination, equal economic access, and a rebuilt capitalist, democratic Europe that could again serve as a hub in world affairs.

=== Containment ===
For NATO, containment of the expansion of Soviet influence became foreign policy doctrine; the expectation was that eventually the inefficient Soviet system would collapse of internal weakness, and no "hot" war (that is, one with large-scale combat) would be necessary. Containment was supported by Republicans (led by Senator Arthur Vandenberg of Michigan, Governor Thomas Dewey of New York, and general Dwight D. Eisenhower), but was opposed by the isolationists led by Senator Robert A. Taft of Ohio.

=== 1949–1953 ===
In 1949, the communist leader Mao Zedong won control of mainland China in a civil war, established the People's Republic of China, then traveled to Moscow where he negotiated the Sino-Soviet Treaty of Friendship, Alliance and Mutual Assistance. China had thus moved from a close ally of the U.S. to a bitter enemy, and the two fought each other starting in late 1950 in Korea. The Truman administration responded with a secret 1950 plan, NSC 68, designed to confront the communists with large-scale defense spending. The Russians had built an atomic bomb by 1949, much sooner than expected. Truman then ordered the development of the hydrogen bomb. Two of the spies who gave atomic secrets to Russia were tried and executed.

France was hard-pressed by communist insurgents in the First Indochina War. The U.S. in 1950 started to fund the French effort on the proviso that the Vietnamese be given more autonomy.

=== Korean War ===
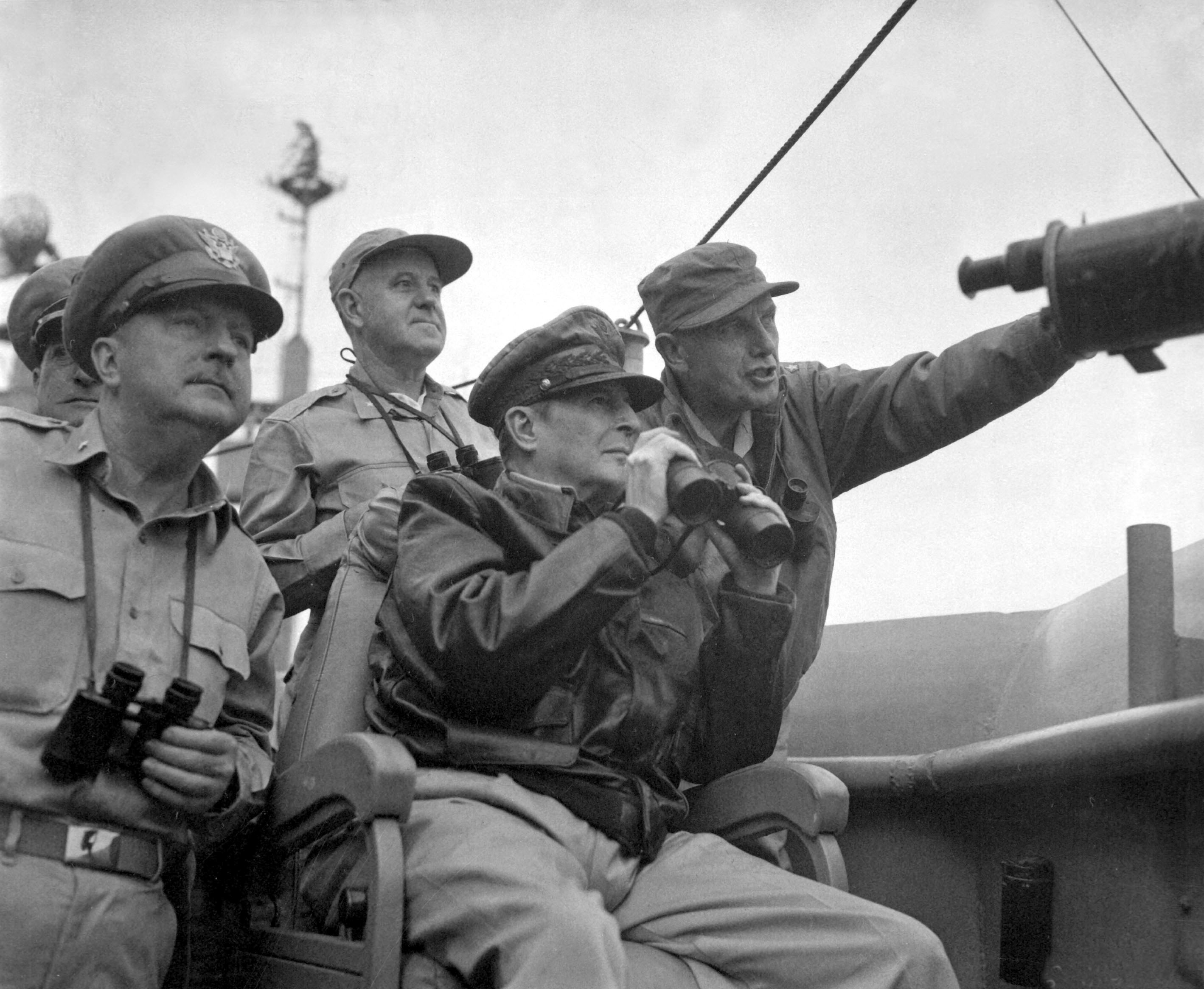
Gen. MacArthur, UN Command CiC (seated), observes the naval shelling of Incheon from the USS Mt. McKinley, 15 September 1950.

Stalin approved a North Korean plan to invade U.S.-supported South Korea in June 1950. President Truman immediately and unexpectedly implemented the containment policy by a full-scale commitment of American and UN forces to Korea. He did not consult or gain approval of Congress but did gain the approval of the United Nations (UN) to drive back the North Koreans and re-unite that country in terms of a rollback strategy. While originally a civil war, it quickly escalated into a proxy war between the United States and its allies and the communist powers of the People's Republic of China and the Soviet Union.

After a few weeks of retreat, on September 15 General Douglas MacArthur conducted an amphibious landing at the city of Inchon (Song Do port). The North Korean army collapsed, and within a few days, MacArthur's army retook Seoul (South Korea's capital). He then pushed north, capturing Pyongyang in October. This advantage was lost when hundreds of thousands of Chinese entered an undeclared war against the United States and pushed the US/UN/Korean forces back to the original starting line, the 38th parallel.

MacArthur planned for a full-scale invasion of China, but this was against the wishes of President Harry S. Truman and others who supported a ceasefire and UN withdrawal from Korea. As a result, Truman relieved MacArthur of command, replacing him with general Matthew Ridgway, who de-escalated the fighting to allow for a peace deal to be made. Dwight D. Eisenhower in 1952 campaigned against Truman's failures of "Korea, Communism and Corruption," promising to go to Korea himself and end the war. By threatening to use nuclear weapons in 1953, Eisenhower ended the war with a truce that is still in effect.

An armistice agreement was finally agreed to by the United Nations Command, the Korean People's Army, and the Chinese People's Volunteer Army on July 27, 1953. The war left 33,742 American soldiers dead, 92,134 wounded, and 80,000 missing in action (MIA) or prisoner of war (POW). Estimates place Korean and Chinese casualties at 1,000,000–1,400,000 dead or wounded, and 140,000 MIA or POW.

=== Vietnam War ===
The United States began involvement in Vietnam during World War II. During the Japanese occupation of French Indochina, the United States sent aid to Vietnamese communist leader Ho Chi Minh's Viet Minh resistance movement to fight the occupying Japanese forces. While President Roosevelt supported the creation of an independent Vietnamese state, following the war the Truman administration supported the restoration of French rule in Indochina. The United States continued to support France against the communist Viet Minh during the First Indochina War as part of its containment policy, supplying the French with weapons and American military advisors. After the Viet Minh defeated the French at the Battle of Dien Bien Phu in 1954, the United States objected to elections to unify Vietnam, and the nation was divided between communist North Vietnam and anti-communist South Vietnam, with the U.S. supporting the latter. Under the Eisenhower and Kennedy presidential administrations, the United States sent weapons and limited numbers of U.S. troops to South Vietnam to support the Army of the Republic of Vietnam (ARVN) in its operations against the North Vietnamese forces and Viet Cong guerrilla movement.

On August 7, 1964, Congress passed the Gulf of Tonkin Resolution. It would allow President Lyndon Johnson to wage war in Vietnam.

=== Anti-communism and McCarthyism: 1947–1954 ===
In 1947, well before McCarthy became active, the Conservative Coalition in Congress passed the Taft–Hartley Act, designed to balance the rights of management and unions, and delegitimizing communist union leaders. The challenge of rooting out communists from labor unions and the Democratic Party was successfully undertaken by liberals, such as Walter Reuther of the autoworkers union and Ronald Reagan of the Screen Actors Guild (Reagan was a liberal Democrat at the time). Many of the purged leftists joined the presidential campaign in 1948 of FDR's Vice President Henry A. Wallace.

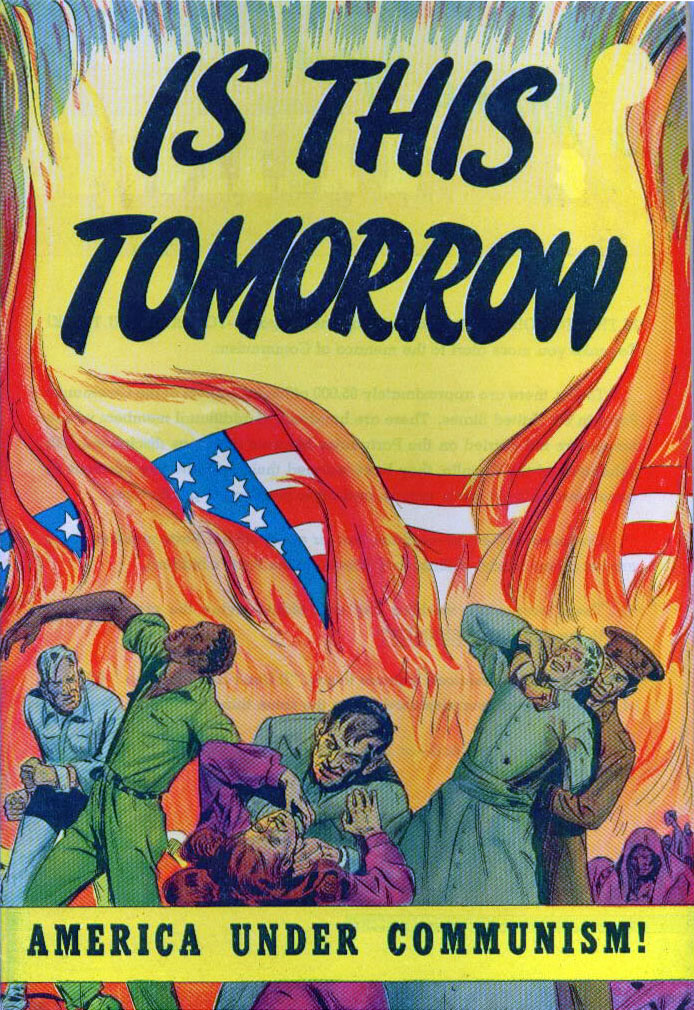
A 1947 booklet published by the Catholic Catechetical Guild Educational Society raising the specter of a Communist takeover

The House Un-American Activities Committee, with young Congressman Richard M. Nixon playing a central role, accused Alger Hiss, a top Roosevelt aide, of being a communist spy, using testimony and documents provided by Whittaker Chambers. Hiss was convicted and sent to prison, with the anti-communists gaining a powerful political weapon. It launched Nixon's meteoric rise to the Senate (1950) and the vice presidency (1952).

With anxiety over communism in Korea and China reaching fever pitch in 1950, a previously obscure Senator, Joseph McCarthy of Wisconsin, launched Congressional investigations into the cover-up of spies in the government. McCarthy dominated the media, and used reckless allegations and tactics that allowed his opponents to effectively counterattack. Irish Catholics (including conservative wunderkind William F. Buckley, Jr. and the Kennedy Family) were intensely anti-communist and defended McCarthy (a fellow Irish Catholic). Paterfamilias Joseph Kennedy (1888–1969), a very active conservative Democrat, was McCarthy's most ardent supporter and got his son Robert F. Kennedy a job with McCarthy. McCarthy had talked of "twenty years of treason" (i.e. since Roosevelt's election in 1932). When, in 1953, he started talking of "21 years of treason" and launched a major attack on the Army for promoting a communist dentist in the medical corps, his recklessness proved too much for Eisenhower, who encouraged Republicans to censure McCarthy formally in 1954. The Senator's power collapsed overnight. Senator John F. Kennedy did not vote for censure. Buckley went on to found the National Review in 1955 as a weekly magazine that helped define the conservative position on public issues.

"McCarthyism" was expanded to include attacks on supposed communist influence in Hollywood, which resulted in the Hollywood blacklist, whereby artists who refused to testify about possible communist connections could not get work. Some famous celebrities (such as Charlie Chaplin) left the U.S.; other worked under pseudonyms (such as Dalton Trumbo). McCarthyism included investigations into academics and teachers as well. McCarthyism became a widespread social and cultural phenomenon that affected all levels of society and was the source of a great deal of debate and conflict in the United States. Investigating private citizens for alleged communist affiliations in government, private-industry and in the media produced widespread fear and destroyed the lives of many innocent American citizens. Using innuendo and intense interrogation methods, the "witch-hunt" produced blacklists in several industries. In the course of the anti-communist investigations in the early 1950s Julius and Ethel Rosenberg were charged in relation to the passing of information about the atomic bomb to the Soviet Union, and they were convicted of conspiracy to commit espionage. On June 19, 1953, they were both executed. Their execution was the first of civilians, for espionage, in United States history.

In addition to communists, and those in the entertainment industry, McCarthy also targeted homosexuals, particularly those employed in the State Department during the Lavender Scare—during the New Deal era, a significant amount of gays and lesbians had come to work in Washington, partially out of a desire to escape discrimination in small town America. Using Sumner Wells (the disgraced former Undersecretary of State to Franklin D. Roosevelt) as an example, McCarthy derided the effeminate, scandalous homosexuals who were allegedly controlling United States foreign relations. McCarthy also posed the suggestion that these homosexuals were a security risk to the United States, as their sexuality made them open to blackmail from the Soviet Union. Shortly after taking office in 1953, President Eisenhower passed an executive order banning homosexuals from Federal jobs. This prohibition remained in effect until 1977.

=== Suez Crisis ===
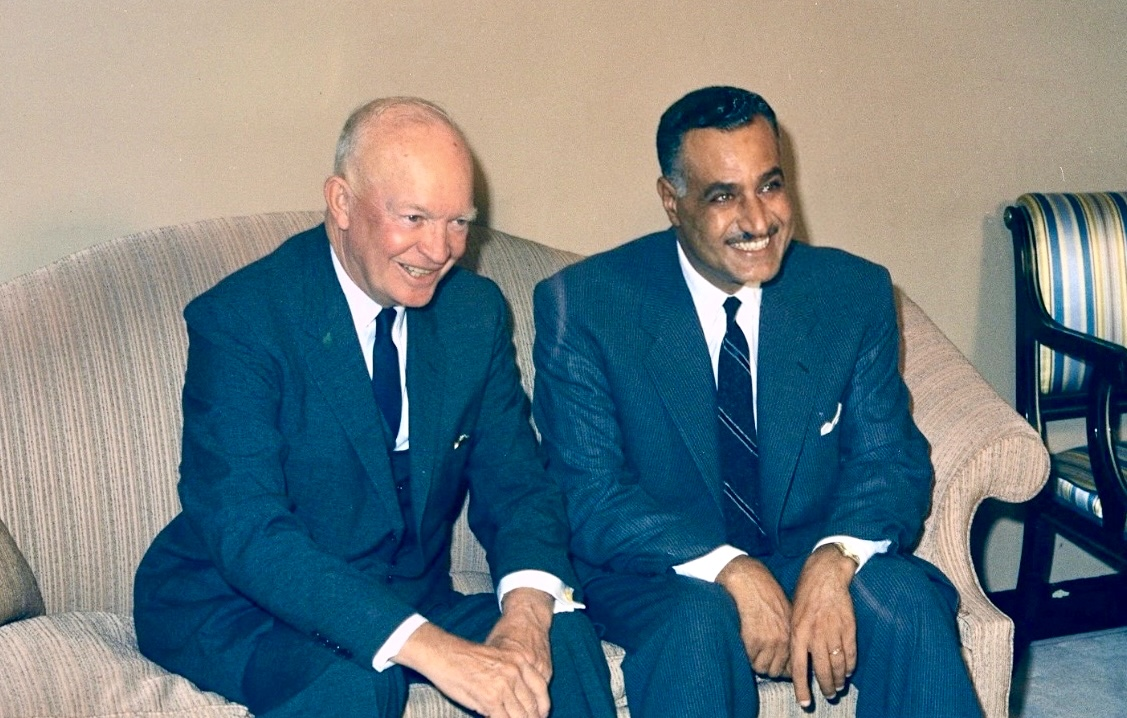
Eisenhower and Gamal Abdel Nasser in New York, 1960

The Suez Crisis was a war fought over control of the Suez Canal. It followed the unexpected nationalization of the Suez Canal in 1956 by Gamal Abdel Nasser, in which the United Kingdom, France, and Israel invaded to take control of the canal. The U.S. had strongly warned against military action. The operation was a military success, but the canal was blocked for years to come. Eisenhower demanded the invaders withdraw, and they did. This action was a major humiliation for Britain and France, two Western European countries, and symbolizes the beginning of the end of colonialism and the weakening of European global importance, specifically the collapse of the British Empire. The United States then became much more deeply involved in Middle Eastern politics, and remains so into the 21st century.

=== Eisenhower and Kennedy administrations ===
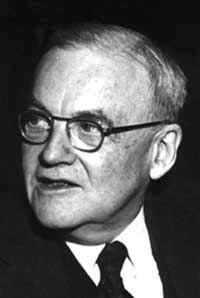
John Foster Dulles directed U.S. foreign policy during the Eisenhower administration.

In 1953, Joseph Stalin died, and after the 1952 presidential election, President Dwight D. Eisenhower used the opportunity to end the Korean War, while continuing Cold War policies. Secretary of State John Foster Dulles was the dominant figure in the nation's foreign policy in the 1950s. Dulles denounced the "containment" of the Truman administration and espoused an active program of "liberation", which would lead to a "rollback" of communism. The most prominent of those doctrines was the policy of "massive retaliation", which Dulles announced early in 1954, eschewing the costly, conventional ground forces characteristic of the Truman administration in favor of wielding the vast superiority of the U.S. nuclear arsenal and covert intelligence. Dulles defined this approach as "brinkmanship".

A dramatic shock to Americans' self-confidence and its technological superiority came in 1957, when the Soviets beat the United States into outer space by launching Sputnik, the first earth satellite. The space race began, and by the early 1960s the United States had forged ahead, with President Kennedy promising to land a man on the moon by the end of the 1960s—the landing indeed took place on July 20, 1969.

Trouble close to home appeared when Fidel Castro took control of Cuba in 1959 and forged increasingly close ties with the Soviet Union, becoming communism's center in Latin America. The United States responded with an economic boycott of Cuba, and a large-scale economic support program for Latin America under Kennedy, the Alliance for Progress.

East Germany was the weak point in the Soviet Empire, with refugees leaving for the West by the thousands every week. The Soviet solution came in 1961, with the Berlin Wall to stop East Germans from fleeing communism. This was a major propaganda setback for the USSR, but it did allow them to keep control of East Berlin.

The communist world split in half, as China turned against the Soviet Union; Mao denounced Khrushchev for going soft on capitalism. However, the US failed to take advantage of this split until President Richard Nixon saw the opportunity in 1969. In 1958, the U.S. sent troops into Lebanon for nine months to stabilize a country on the verge of civil war. Between 1954 and 1961, Eisenhower dispatched large sums of economic and military aid and 695 military advisers to South Vietnam to stabilize the pro-western government under attack by insurgents. Eisenhower supported CIA efforts to undermine anti-American governments, which proved most successful in Iran and in Guatemala.

The first major strain among the NATO alliance occurred in 1956 when Eisenhower forced Britain and France to retreat from their invasion of Egypt (with Israel) which was intended to get back their ownership of the Suez Canal. Instead of supporting the claims of its NATO partners, the Eisenhower administration stated that it opposed French and British imperial adventurism in the region by sheer prudence, fearing that Egyptian leader Gamal Abdel Nasser's standoff with the region's old colonial powers would bolster Soviet power in the region.

The Cold War reached its most dangerous point during the Kennedy administration in the Cuban Missile Crisis, a tense confrontation between the Soviet Union and the United States over the Soviet deployment of nuclear missiles in Cuba. The crisis began on October 16, 1962, and lasted for thirteen days. It was the moment when the Cold War was closest to exploding into a devastating nuclear exchange between the two superpower nations. Kennedy decided not to invade or bomb Cuba but to institute a naval blockade of the island. The crisis ended in a compromise, with the Soviets removing their missiles publicly, and the United States secretly removing its nuclear missiles in Turkey. In Moscow, communist leaders removed Nikita Khrushchev because of his reckless behavior.

=== Americas ===
- In the 1950s, Latin America was the center of covert and overt conflict between the Soviet Union and the United States. Their varying collusion with national, populist, and elitist interests destabilized the region. The United States Central Intelligence Agency orchestrated the overthrow of the Guatemalan government (Operation PBSuccess) in 1952.
- In 1958, the military dictatorship of Venezuela was overthrown. This continued a pattern of regional revolution and warfare making extensive use of ground forces.
- In 1957, Dr. François Duvalier came to power in an election in Haiti. He later declared himself president for life, and ruled until his death in 1971.
- In 1959, Fidel Castro overthrew the regime of Fulgencio Batista in Cuba, establishing a communist government in the country. Although Castro initially sought aid from the US, he was rebuffed and later turned to the Soviet Union.
- NORAD signed in 1959 by Canada and the United States creating a unified North American aerial defense system.

=== Cuban Revolution ===
The overthrow of Fulgencio Batista by Fidel Castro, Che Guevara and other forces in 1959 resulted in the creation of the first communist government in the western hemisphere. The Cuban Missile Crisis of 1962 led to a confrontation between the United States, Cuba, and the Soviet Union.

=== Indonesia ===
In Indonesia in February 1958 rebels on Sumatra and Sulawesi declared the PRRI-Permesta Movement aimed at overthrowing the government of Sukarno. Due to their anti-communist rhetoric, the rebels received money, weapons, and manpower from the CIA. This support ended when Allen Lawrence Pope, an American pilot, was shot down after a bombing raid on government-held Ambon in April 1958. In April 1958, the central government responded by launching airborne and seaborne military invasions on Padang and Manado, the rebel capitals. By the end of 1958, the rebels had been militarily defeated, and the last remaining rebel guerrilla bands surrendered in August 1961.

== Society ==
At the center of middle-class culture in the 1950s was a growing demand for consumer goods; a result of the postwar prosperity, the increase in variety and availability of consumer products, and television advertising. America generated a steadily growing demand for better automobiles, clothing, appliances, family vacations and higher education. After the initial hurdles of the 1945-48 period were overcome, Americans found themselves flush with cash from wartime work due to there being little to buy for several years. The result was a mass consumer spending spree, with a huge and voracious demand for new homes, cars, and housewares. Increasing numbers enjoyed high wages, larger houses, better schools, more cars and home comforts like vacuum cleaners, washing machines—which were all made for labor-saving and to make housework easier. Inventions familiar in the early 21st century made their first appearance during this era. The live-in maid and cook, common features of middle-class homes at the beginning of the century, were virtually unheard of in the 1950s; only the very rich had servants. Householders enjoyed centrally heated homes with running hot water. New style furniture was bright, cheap, and light, and easy to move around. As noted by John Kenneth Galbraith in 1958:

the ordinary individual has access to amenities – foods, entertainments, personal transportation, and plumbing – in which not even the rich rejoiced a century ago.

=== Economy ===
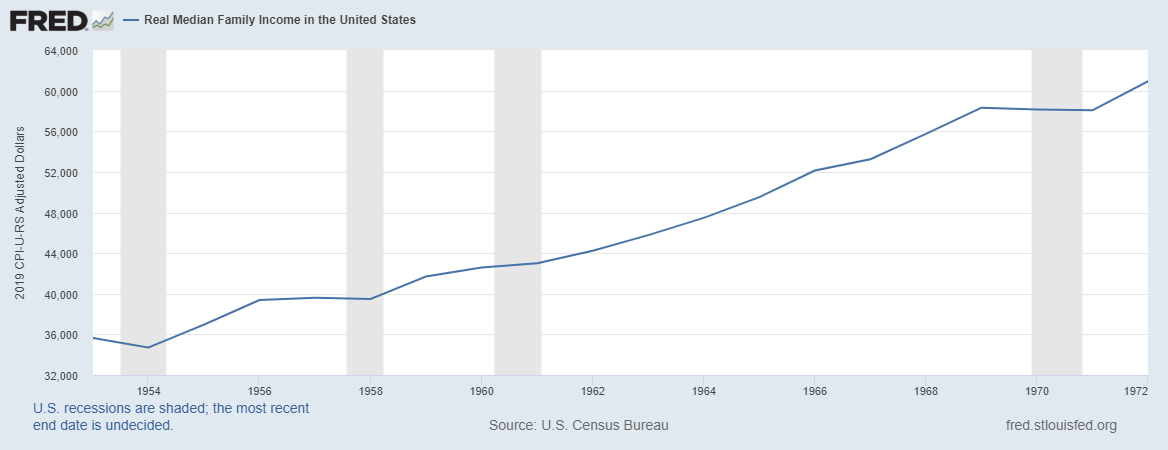
Real median family income in constant 2019 dollars, 1953–1972

Between 1945 and 1960, GNP grew by 250%, expenditures on new construction multiplied nine times, and consumption on personal services increased three times. By 1960, per capita income was 35% higher than in 1945, and America had entered what the economist Walt Rostow referred to as the "high mass consumption" stage of economic development. Short-term credit went up from $8.4 billion in 1946 to $45.6 billion in 1958. As a result of the postwar economic boom, 60% of the American population had attained a "middle-class" standard of living by the mid-1950s (defined as incomes of $3,000 to $10,000 in constant dollars), compared with only 31% in the last year of prosperity before the onset of the Great Depression in 1929. By the end of the decade, 87% of families owned a TV set, 75% owned a car, and 75% owned a washing machine. Between 1947 and 1960, the average real income for American workers increased by as much as it had in the previous half-century.

Prosperity and overall optimism made Americans feel that it was a good time to bring children into the world, and so a huge baby boom resulted during the decade following 1945 (the baby boom climaxed during the mid-1950s, after which time birthrates gradually declined until going below replacement level in 1965). Although the overall number of children per woman was not unusually high (averaging 2.3), they were assisted by improving technology that greatly brought down infant mortality rates versus the prewar era. Among other things, this resulted in an unprecedented demand for children's products and a huge expansion of the public school system. The large size of the postwar baby-boom generation would have significant social repercussions in American society for decades to come.

In addition to the huge domestic market for consumer items, the United States became "the world's factory", as it was the only major power whose soil had been untouched by the war. American money and manufactured goods flooded into Europe, South Korea, and Japan and helped in their reconstruction. US manufacturing dominance would be almost unchallenged for a quarter-century after 1945.

The American economy grew dramatically in the post-war period, expanding at a rate of 3.5% per year between 1945 and 1970. During this period of prosperity, many incomes doubled in a generation, described by economist Frank Levy as "upward mobility on a rocket ship." The substantial increase in average family income within a generation resulted in millions of office and factory workers being lifted into a growing middle class, enabling them to sustain a standard of living once considered to be reserved for the wealthy. As noted by Deone Zell, assembly-line work paid well, while unionized factory jobs served as "stepping-stones to the middle class." By the end of the 1950s, 87% of all American families owned at least one T.V., 75% owned cars, and 60% owned their homes. By 1960, blue-collar workers had become the biggest buyers of many luxury goods and services. In addition, by the early-1970s, post-World War II American consumers enjoyed higher levels of disposable income than those in any other country.

The great majority of American workers who had stable jobs were well-off financially, while even non-union jobs were associated with rising paychecks, benefits, and obtained many of the advantages that characterized union work. An upscale working class came into being, as American blue-collar workers came to enjoy the benefits of home ownership, while high wages provided blue-collar workers with the ability to pay for new cars, household appliances, and regular vacations. By the 1960s, a blue-collar worker earned more than a manager did in the 1940s, despite the fact that the former's relative position within the income distribution had not changed.

As noted by the historian Nancy Wierek:

In the postwar period, the majority of Americans were affluent in the sense that they were in a position to spend money on many things they wanted, desired, or chose to have, rather than on necessities alone.

As argued by the historians Ronald Edsforth and Larry Bennett:

By the mid-1960s, the majority of America's organized working class who were not victims of the second Red Scare embraced, or at least tolerated, anti-communism because it was an integral part of the New American Dream to which they had committed their lives. Theirs was not an unobtainable dream; nor were their lives empty because of it. Indeed, for at least a quarter of century, the material promises of consumer-oriented Americanism were fulfilled in improvements in everyday life that made them the most affluent working class in American history.

Between 1946 and 1960, the United States witnessed a significant expansion in the consumption of goods and services. GNP rose by 36% and personal consumption expenditures by 42%, cumulative gains which were reflected in the incomes of families and unrelated individuals. While the number of these units rose sharply from 43.3 million to 56.1 million in 1960, a rise of almost 23%, their average incomes grew even faster, from $3,940 in 1946 to $6,900 in 1960, an increase of 43%. After taking inflation into account, the real increase was 16%. The dramatic rise in the average American standard of living was such that, according to sociologist George Katona:

"Today in this country minimum standards of nutrition, housing and clothing are assured, not for all, but for the majority. Beyond these minimum needs, such former luxuries as homeownership, durable goods, travel, recreation, and entertainment are no longer restricted to a few. The broad masses participate in enjoying all these things and generate most of the demand for them."

More than 21 million housing units were constructed between 1946 and 1960, and in the latter year 52% of consumer units in the metropolitan areas owned their own homes. In 1957, out of all the wired homes throughout the country, 96% had a refrigerator, 87% an electric washer, 81% a television, 67% a vacuum cleaner, 18% a freezer, 12% an electric or gas dryer, and 8% air conditioning. Car ownership also soared, with 72% of consumer units owning an automobile by 1960. From 1958 to 1964, the average weekly take-home pay of blue-collar workers rose steadily from $68 to $78 (in constant dollars). In a poll taken in 1949, 50% of all Americans said that they were satisfied with their family income, a figure that rose to 67% by 1969.

The period from 1946 to 1960 also witnessed a significant increase in the paid leisure time of working people. The forty-hour workweek established by the Fair Labor Standards Act in covered industries became the actual schedule in most workplaces by 1960, while uncovered workers such as farmworkers and the self-employed worked fewer hours than they had done previously, although they still worked much longer hours than most other workers. Paid vacations also came to be enjoyed by the vast majority of workers, with 91% of blue-collar workers covered by major collective bargaining agreements receiving paid vacations by 1957 (usually to a maximum of three weeks), while by the early-1960s virtually all industries paid for holidays and most did so for seven days a year. Industries catering to leisure activities blossomed as a result of most Americans enjoying significant paid leisure time by 1960, while many blue-collar and white-collar workers had come to expect to hold on to their jobs for life. This period saw the growth of motels along major highways, as well as amusement parks such as Disneyland, which opened in 1955.

Educational outlays were also greater than in other countries while a higher proportion of young people were graduating from high schools and universities than elsewhere in the world, as hundreds of new colleges and universities opened every year. Tuition was kept low—it was free at California state universities. At the advanced level, American science, engineering, and medicine was world-famous. By the mid-1960s, the majority of American workers enjoyed the highest wage levels in the world, and by the late-1960s, the great majority of Americans were richer than people in other countries, except Sweden, Switzerland, and Canada. Educational outlays were also greater than in other countries while a higher proportion of young people was at school and college than elsewhere in the world. As noted by the historian John Vaizey:

To strike a balance with the Soviet Union, it would be easy to say that all but the very poorest Americans were better off than the Russians, that education was better but the health service worse, but that above all the Americans had freedom of expression and democratic institutions

In regards to social welfare, the post-war era saw a considerable improvement in insurance for workers and their dependents against the risks of illness, as private insurance programs like Blue Cross and Blue Shield expanded. With the exception of farm and domestic workers, virtually all members of the labor force were covered by Social Security. In 1959, about two-thirds of the factory workers and three-fourths of the office workers were provided with supplemental private pension plans. In addition, 86% of factory workers and 83% of office workers had jobs that covered for hospital insurance while 59% and 61% had additional insurance for doctors. By 1969, the average White family income had risen to $10,953, while the average Black family income lagged behind at $7,255, revealing a continued racial disparity in income among various segments of the American population. The percentage of American students continuing their education after the age of fifteen was also higher than in most other developed countries, with more than 90% of 16-year-olds and around 75% of 17-year-olds in school in 1964–66.

Despite overall prosperity during the 1950s, Eisenhower was a budget hawk and pursued a conservative fiscal policy designed to pay down the government's debts from two wars. He did not move to lower the 90% Federal income tax rates left over from World War II and there were three economic recessions over his presidency—a mild one in 1953-54 that followed up on the end of the Korean War and a bigger out that began in late 1957 and lasted through 1958. Another recession followed in 1960. Vice President Nixon blamed this on the president's monetary policy and thought he should have loosened the money supply to stimulate economic growth—the sluggish US economy was extensively exploited by Democrats during the 1960 presidential election.

The recession lifted a month into Kennedy's administration and by the fall of 1961 the economy had begun an unprecedented boom. In a December 1962 speech, he announced his plans to reduce the top marginal tax rate to 75%, which one GOP Congressman wryly dubbed "the most Republican speech a president has made since McKinley". Although the president did not live to see his tax proposal passed, Lyndon Johnson quickly steered it through Congress, and by late 1965, real GDP growth was exceeding 6% a year. The US economy remained strong for the most part until the OPEC embargo in 1973.

=== Cars ===
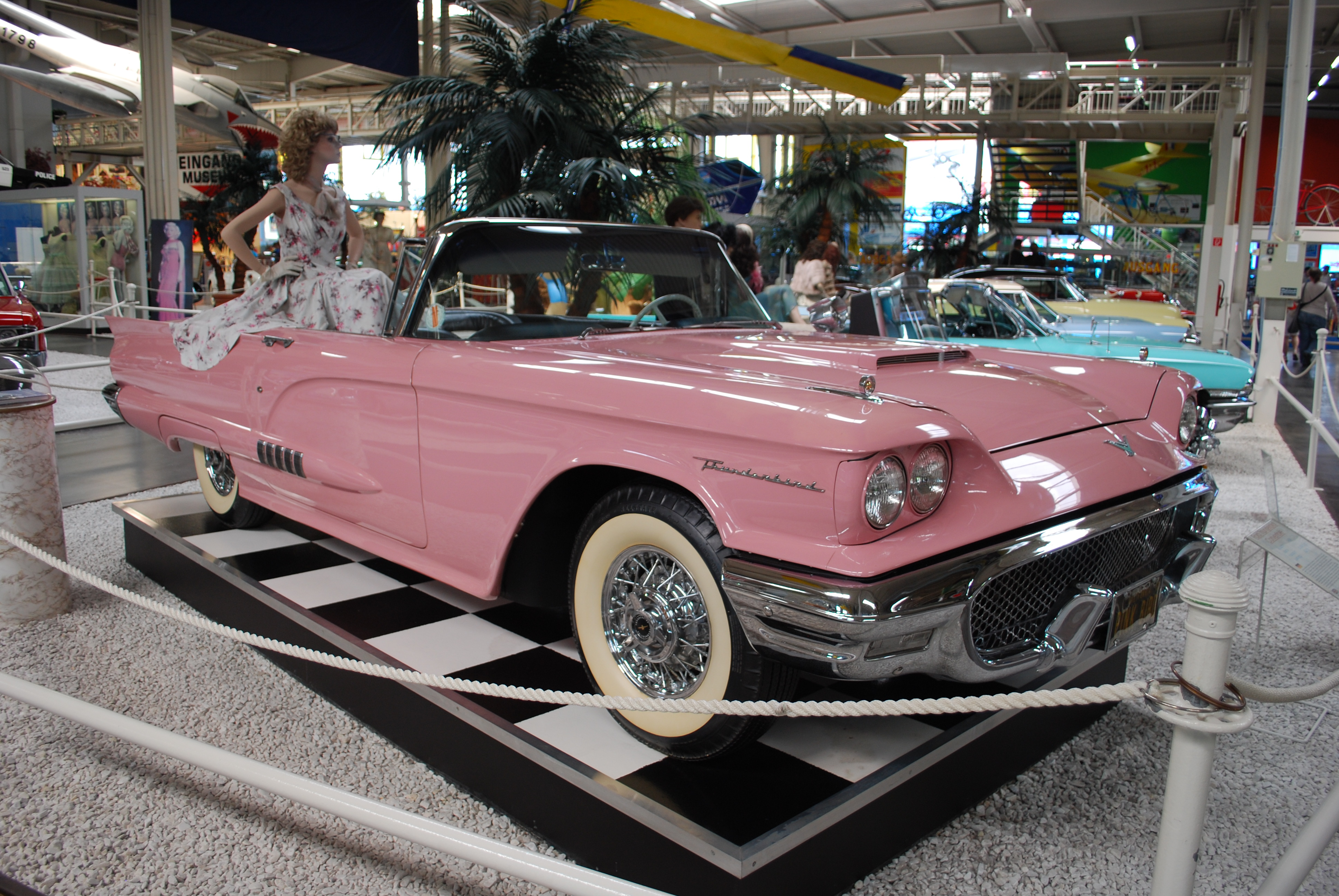
1958 four-seat Ford Thunderbird

Automobiles became much more available, after the low production runs in the Depression, followed by the moratorium on production during the Second World War, when factories produced Jeeps and other military transport vehicles instead of cars. Styles became flashier. Boxy and conservative in the first half of the decade, they became lower, longer, wider, and sleeker. Tail fins, chrome, and multicolor paint jobs characterized the late 1950s. It was the beginning of the end for the small auto manufacturers, which were crippled by the Ford-GM price war of 1953–1954. Studebaker went under; the others merged into American Motors, whose Rambler chugged into the 1960s.

Ford's launch of the new Edsel in 1958 was hotly anticipated, but it was a lemon and was cancelled after only three years. The name "Edsel" became an icon of failure. The 1950s was also the decade when the popular sport Formula One started.

==== "Women and Automobility" ====
During the post-World War II period, the growth of suburban communities reshaped household life in the United States. The suburban boom was shaped by suburban design principles that emphasized low-density housing, single-family lots, and spatial separation between residential areas and commercial centers. Many white middle-class became increasingly dependent on automobiles to manage domestic responsibilities, as many suburban neighborhoods were often far from shops and school and lacked convenient public transportation. The rise of automobile use coincided with a period of expanding consumer culture that encouraged weekly supermarket trip and the purchase of new household appliances. Historian William Chafe has noted that family life in the 1950s often centered around children's needs, which led many mothers to use cars frequently for errands and to transport their children to and from school and extracurricular activities.

=== Suburbia ===
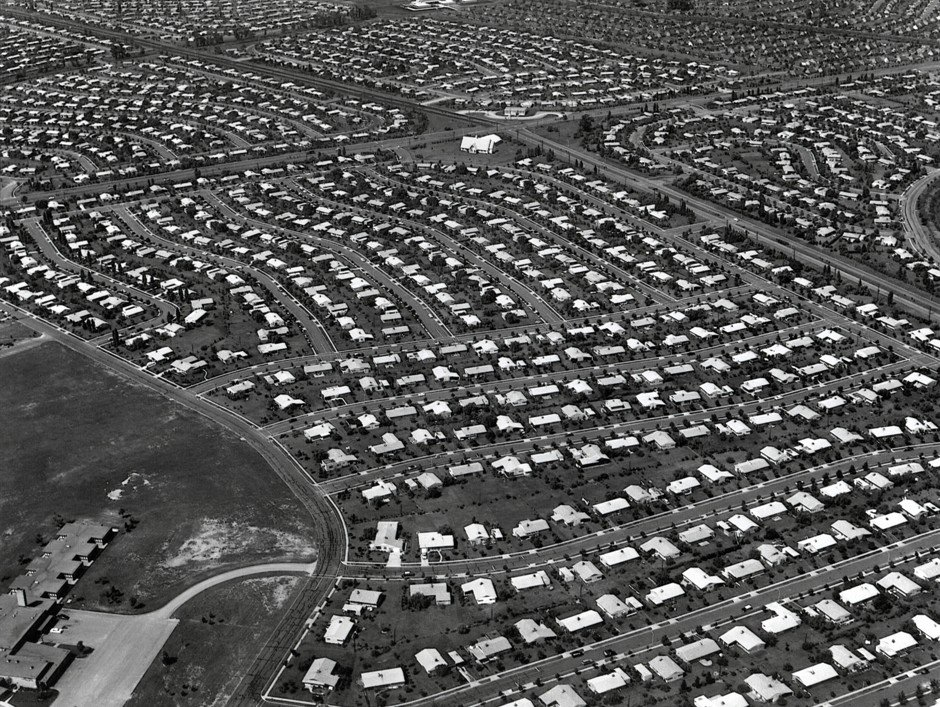
Aerial view of Levittown, Pennsylvania, c. 1959

Very little housing had been built during the Great Depression and World War, except for emergency quarters near war industries. Overcrowded and inadequate apartments was the common condition. Some suburbs had developed around large cities where there was rail transportation to the jobs downtown. However, the real growth in suburbia depended on the availability of automobiles, highways, and inexpensive housing. The population had grown, and the stock of family savings had accumulated the money for down payments, automobiles and appliances. The product was a great housing boom. Whereas an average of 316,000 new housing nonfarm units had been constructed each year from the 1930s through 1945, there were 1,450,000 built annually from 1946 through 1955 in all areas, especially suburbs.

With the massive mobilization of the U.S. military during World War II, concerns emerged about mass unemployment among former servicemen following the end of the war and demobilization of the Armed Forces. In 1944, President Roosevelt signed the G.I. Bill, which was designed to help American servicemen secure employment after the war was over. The bill guaranteed low cost loans for veterans, with very low down payments, and low interest rates. With 16,000,000 eligible veterans, the opportunity to buy a house was suddenly at hand. In 1947 alone, 540,000 veterans bought one; their average price was $7,300 (equal to $84,000 in 2020). The construction industry kept prices low by standardization – for example standardizing sizes for kitchen cabinets, refrigerators, and stoves allowed for mass production of kitchen furnishings. Developers purchased empty land just outside the city, installed tract houses based on a handful of designs, and provided streets and utilities, as local public officials race to build schools. The most famous development was Levittown, in Long Island just east of New York City. It offered a new house for $1,000 down, and $70 a month; it featured three bedrooms, fireplace, gas range and gas furnace, and a landscaped lot of 75 by 100 feet, all for a total price of $10,000. Veterans could get one with a much lower down payment. Growth of the suburbs was especially prominent in the Sunbelt regions of the country; one example of a suburb on the West Coast was Lakewood, California, built largely to serve families of aviation workers. Going hand-in-hand with suburban development was the rise of shopping malls, fast-food restaurants and coffee shops.

With Detroit turning out automobiles as fast as possible, city dwellers gave up cramped apartments for a suburban life style centered around children and housewives, with the male breadwinner commuting to work. Suburbia encompassed one-third of the nation's population by 1960. The growth of suburbs was not only a result of postwar prosperity, but innovations of the single-family housing market with low interest rates on 20 and 30 year mortgages, and low down payments, especially for veterans. Meanwhile, the suburban population swelled because of the baby boom. Suburbs provided larger homes for larger families, security from urban living, privacy, and space for consumer goods.

=== Science, technology, and futurism ===
With the prosperity of the era, the prevailing social attitude was one of belief in science, technology, progress, and futurism, although there had been signs of this trend since the 1930s. There was comparatively little nostalgia for the prewar era and the overall emphasis was on having everything new and more advanced than before. Nonetheless, the social conformity and consumerism of the 1950s often came under attack from intellectuals (e.g. Henry Miller's books The Air-Conditioned Nightmare and Sunday After The War) and there was a good deal of unrest fermenting under the surface of American society that would erupt during the following decade.

One of the key factors in postwar prosperity was a technology boom due to the experience of the war. Manufacturing had made enormous strides and it was now possible to produce consumer goods in quantities and levels of sophistication unseen before 1945. Acquisition of technology from occupied Germany also proved an asset, as it was sometimes more advanced than its American counterpart, especially in the optics and audio equipment fields. The typical automobile in 1950 was an average of $300 more expensive than the 1940 version, but also produced in twice the numbers. Luxury brands such as Cadillac, which had been largely hand-built vehicles only available to the rich, now became a mass-produced car within the price range of the upper middle-class.

The rapid social and technological changes brought about a growing corporatization of America and the decline of smaller businesses, which often suffered from high postwar inflation and mounting operating costs. Newspapers declined in numbers and consolidated, both due to the above-mentioned factors and the advent of TV news. The railroad industry, once one of the cornerstones of the American economy and an immense and often scorned influence on national politics, also suffered from the explosion in automobile sales and the construction of the interstate system. By the end of the 1950s, it was well into decline and by the 1970s became completely bankrupt, necessitating a takeover by the federal government. Smaller automobile manufacturers such as Nash, Studebaker, and Packard were unable to compete with the Big Three in the new postwar world and gradually declined into oblivion over the next fifteen years. Suburbanization caused the gradual movement of working-class people and jobs out of the inner cities as shopping centers displaced the traditional downtown stores. In time, this would have disastrous effects on urban areas.

Major technological events of this period include:

- The Miller–Urey experiment showed in 1953 that under simulated conditions resembling those thought to be possible to have existed shortly after Earth was first created, many of the basic organic molecules that form the building blocks of life are able to spontaneously form.
- Francis Crick, and James D. Watson, discovered the helical structure of DNA at the Cavendish Laboratory at the University of Cambridge in 1953.
- Bruce C. Heezen discovered the Mid-Atlantic Ridge.
- The first polio vaccine, developed by Dr. Jonas Salk, was introduced to the general public in 1955.
- The first organ transplants were done in Boston and Paris in 1954.
- The term artificial intelligence was coined in 1956 by John McCarthy.
- Sputnik 1 was launched in 1957. The US then launched Explorer 1 three months later, beginning the space race.
- Fortran, perhaps the single most important milestone in the development of programming languages, was developed at IBM.
- The Kinsey Reports were published.
- NASA is organized.

=== Poverty and inequality in the postwar era ===
Despite the prosperity of the postwar era, a significant minority of Americans continued to live in poverty by the end of the 1950s. In 1947, 34% of all families earned less than $3,000 a year, compared with 22.1% in 1960. Nevertheless, between one-fifth to one-quarter of the population could not survive on the income they earned. The older generation of Americans did not benefit as much from the postwar economic boom especially as many had never recovered financially from the loss of their savings during the Great Depression. It was generally a given that the average 35-year-old in 1959 owned a better house and car than the average 65-year-old, who typically had nothing but a small Social Security pension for an income. Many blue-collar workers continued to live in poverty, with 30% of those employed in industry in 1958 receiving under $3,000 a year. In addition, individuals who earned more than $10,000 a year paid a lower proportion of their income in taxes than those who earned less than $2,000 a year. In 1947, 60% of black families lived below the poverty level (defined in one study as below $3000 in 1968 dollars), compared with 23% of white families. In 1968, 23% of black families lived below the poverty level, compared with 9% of white families. In 1947, 11% of white families were affluent (defined as above $10,000 in 1968 dollars), compared with 3% of black families. In 1968, 42% of white families were defined as affluent, compared with 21% of black families. In 1947, 8% of black families received $7000 or more (in 1968 dollars) compared with 26% of white families. In 1968, 39% of black families received $7,000 or more, compared with 66% of white families. In 1960, the median for a married man of blue-collar income was $3,993 for blacks and $5,877 for whites. In 1969, the equivalent figures were $5,746 and $7,452, respectively.

As Socialist leader Michael Harrington emphasized, there was still The Other America. Poverty declined sharply in the 1960s as the New Frontier and Great Society especially helped older people. The proportion below the poverty line fell almost in half from 22% in 1960 to 12% in 1970 and then leveled off.

=== Rural life ===
The farm population shrank steadily as families moved to urban areas, where on average they were more productive and earned a higher standard of living. Friedberger argues that the postwar period saw an accelerating mechanization of agriculture, combined with new and better fertilizers and genetic manipulation of hybrid corn. It made for greater specialization and greater economic risks for the farmer. With rising land prices many sold their land and moved to town, the old farm becoming part of a neighbor's enlarged operation. Mechanization meant less need for hired labor; farmers could operate more acres even though they were older. The result was a decline in rural-farm population, with gains in service centers that provided the new technology. The rural non-farm population grew as factories were attracted by access to good transportation without the high land costs, taxes, unionization and congestion of city factory districts. Once remote rural areas such as the Missouri Ozarks and the North Woods of the upper Midwest, with a rustic life style and many good fishing spots, attracted retirees and vacationers.

== Culture ==
=== Key events ===
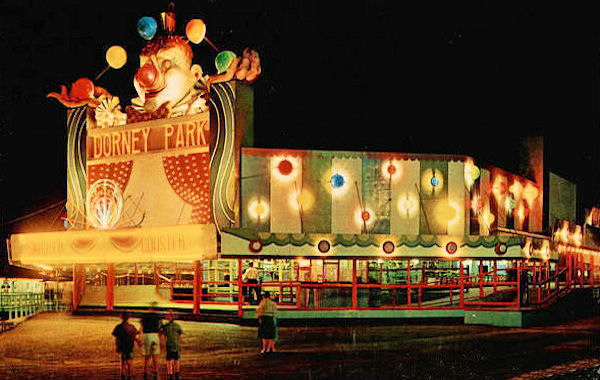
Dorney Park & Wildwater Kingdom in Allentown, Pennsylvania, 1950

- The popularity of television skyrocketed, particularly in the US, where 77% of households purchased their first TV set during the decade.
- The social mores about sex were particularly restrictive, characterized by strong taboos and a nervous attitude for prudish conformity, to the point that even the softcore pornography of the time avoided describing it. The social mores of the decade were marked by overall conservatism and conformity.
- The Day the Earth Stood Still hits movie theaters launching a cycle of Hollywood films in which Cold War fears are manifested through scenarios of alien invasion or mutation.
- Resurgence of evangelical Christianity including Youth for Christ (1943); the National Association of Evangelicals, the American Council of Christian Churches, the Billy Graham Evangelistic Association (1950), Conservative Baptist Association of America (1947); and Campus Crusade for Christ (1951). Christianity Today was first published in 1956. 1956 also marked the beginning of Bethany Fellowship, a small press that grew to be a leading evangelical press.
- Carl Stuart Hamblen, a religious radio broadcaster, hosted the popular show "The Cowboy Church of the Air".
- Hugh Hefner launched Playboy magazine in 1953.
- Disneyland opens in July 1955.

=== Fine arts ===
Abstract expressionism was popular in New York City in the 1950s. This movement acquired its name for combining the German expressionism's emotional intensity with the anti-figurative aesthetic of the European abstract schools such as Futurism, Bauhaus and Synthetic Cubism. Jackson Pollock was one of the most influential painters of this movement, creating famous works such as No. 5, 1948.

Color Field painting and Hard-edge painting followed close on the heels of Abstract expressionism, and became the idiom for new abstraction in painting during the late 1950s. The term second generation was applied to many abstract artists who were related to but following different directions than the early abstract expressionists.

Bay Area Figurative Movement was an important return to figuration and a reaction against abstract expressionism by artists living and working on the West Coast in and around San Francisco during the mid-1950s.

=== Literature ===
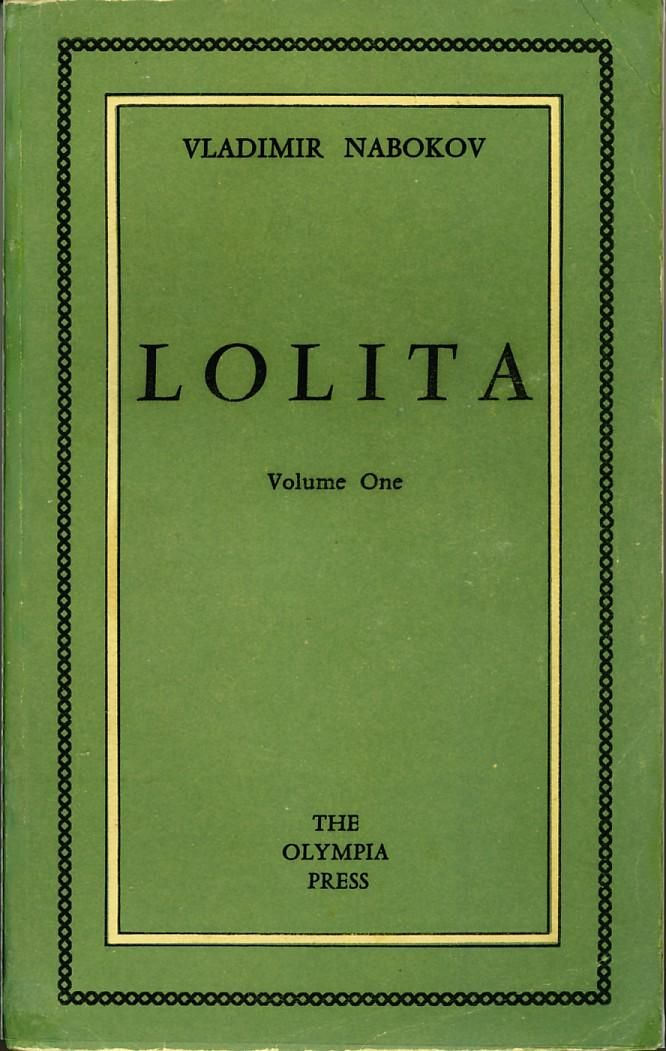
Cover of the first edition of Lolita by Vladimir Nabokov, published by Olympia Press in 1955

The strong sexual taboos of mass culture were also reflected in literature, with the institutionally established modernist tradition, and most writers feeling compelled to self-censor themselves. This would clash with the Beat fiction which pushed the boundaries of what was considered allowed, causing a liberating and exciting cultural effect which encouraged other writers to free up. For this, the Beat movement was met with a series of censorships and law enforcement excesses.

External videos
- Booknotes interview with David Halberstam on The Fifties, July 11, 1993, C-SPAN

One of the most influential and most highly critically acclaimed of the many books about the era is The Fifties by journalist and author David Halberstam.

Beatniks and the Beat Generation, an anti-materialistic literary movement whose name was invented by Jack Kerouac in 1948 and stretched on into the early-mid-1960s, was at its zenith in the 1950s. Such groundbreaking literature from the beats includes William S. Burroughs' Naked Lunch, Allen Ginsberg's Howl, and Jack Kerouac's On the Road. This decade is also marked by some of the most famous works of science fiction by science fiction writers Isaac Asimov, Arthur C. Clarke, Ray Bradbury, Theodore Sturgeon, A. E. van Vogt, and Robert A. Heinlein.

Though it was not published until 1960, John Updike's Rabbit, Run was written during and exemplifies the culture of the 1950s. The novel Revolutionary Road by Richard Yates, published in 1961, is concerned with mid-1950s life and culture. Sylvia Plath's The Bell Jar, though not published until 1963, features a woman's struggle living in 1950s American culture. Agatha Christie was also at a stage where she published at an average rate of one book every year.

In 1963, Betty Friedan published her book The Feminine Mystique which ridiculed the housewife role of women during the postwar years; it was a best-seller and a major catalyst of the women's liberation movement.

=== Fashion ===
The 1950s were a time of fashion evolution. At the beginning of the decade, fitted blouses and jackets with rounded (as opposed to puffy) shoulders and small, round collars were very popular. Narrow pant legs and capris became increasingly popular during this time, often worn with flats, ballet-inspired shoes, and Keds/Converse type sneakers. Thick, heavy heels were popular for low shoes. Socks were sometimes worn, but were not as necessary as they are now. Circle skirts (like the classic poodle skirt) were very popular. They were often hand decorated with various patterns or beads to make them unique and worn over petticoats. Shirt dresses with large, contrasting buttons were also stylish. Early 1950s women wore small hats over hair cut short, à la Audrey Hepburn.

As the 1950s progressed, so too did fashion, until, by the end of the 1950s, the Jackie Kennedy look was in style. A-lines and loose-fitting dresses became more and more popular, and jackets took on a boxy look. Kitten heels and metal/steel stilettos became the most popular shoe style. Flower-pot shaped hats overtook the small ones of earlier in the decade, and large hairstyles, such as that of Liz Taylor, were in.

Prosperity also brought about the development of a distinct youth culture for the first time, as teenagers were not forced to work and support their family at young ages like in the past. This had its culmination in the development of new music genres such as rock-and-roll as well as fashion styles and subcultures, the most famous of which was the "greaser", a young male who drove motorcycles, sported ducktail haircuts (which were widely banned in schools) and displayed a general disregard for the law and authority. The greaser phenomenon was kicked off by the controversial youth-oriented movies The Wild One (1953) starring Marlon Brando and Rebel Without a Cause (1955) starring James Dean.

=== Music ===
Popular music and Country music in the early 1950s featured vocalists like Frank Sinatra, Tony Bennett, Frankie Laine, Patti Page, Hank Williams, Patsy Cline, Judy Garland, Johnnie Ray, Kay Starr, Bill Monroe, Eddy Arnold, Perry Como, Bing Crosby, Dean Martin, Rosemary Clooney, Édith Piaf, Charles Aznavour, Maurice Chevalier, Gene Autry, Tex Ritter, Jimmy Durante, Georgia Gibbs, Eddie Fisher, Pearl Bailey, Jim Reeves, Teresa Brewer, Dinah Shore, Sammy Davis Jr., Tennessee Ernie Ford, Loretta Lynn, Chet Atkins, Guy Mitchell, Nat King Cole, and vocal groups like The Mills Brothers, The Ink Spots, The Four Lads, The Four Aces, The Chordettes, The Jordanaires, and The Ames Brothers.

Jazz stars in the 1950s who came into prominence in their genres called Bebop, Hard bop, Cool jazz and the Blues, at this time included Lester Young, Ben Webster, Charlie Parker, Dizzy Gillespie, Miles Davis, John Coltrane, Thelonious Monk, Charles Mingus, Art Tatum, Bill Evans, Ahmad Jamal, Oscar Peterson, Gil Evans, Gerry Mulligan, Cannonball Adderley, Stan Getz, Chet Baker, Dave Brubeck, Art Blakey, Max Roach, the Miles Davis Quintet, the Modern Jazz Quartet, Ella Fitzgerald, Ray Charles, Sarah Vaughan, Dinah Washington, Nina Simone, and Billie Holiday.

Rock-n-Roll and Electric blues emerged in the mid-1950s as the teen music of choice. Elvis Presley was especially popular. Bill Haley, Jerry Lee Lewis, The Everly Brothers, Carl Perkins, Johnny Cash, Conway Twitty, Johnny Horton, and Marty Robbins were Rockabilly musicians. Doo-wop was another popular genre at the time. Popular Doo Wop and Rock-n-Roll bands of the mid-to-late 1950s include The Platters, The Flamingos, The Dells, The Silhouettes, Frankie Lymon and The Teenagers, Little Anthony and the Imperials, Danny & the Juniors, The Coasters, The Drifters, The Del-Vikings and Dion and the Belmonts.

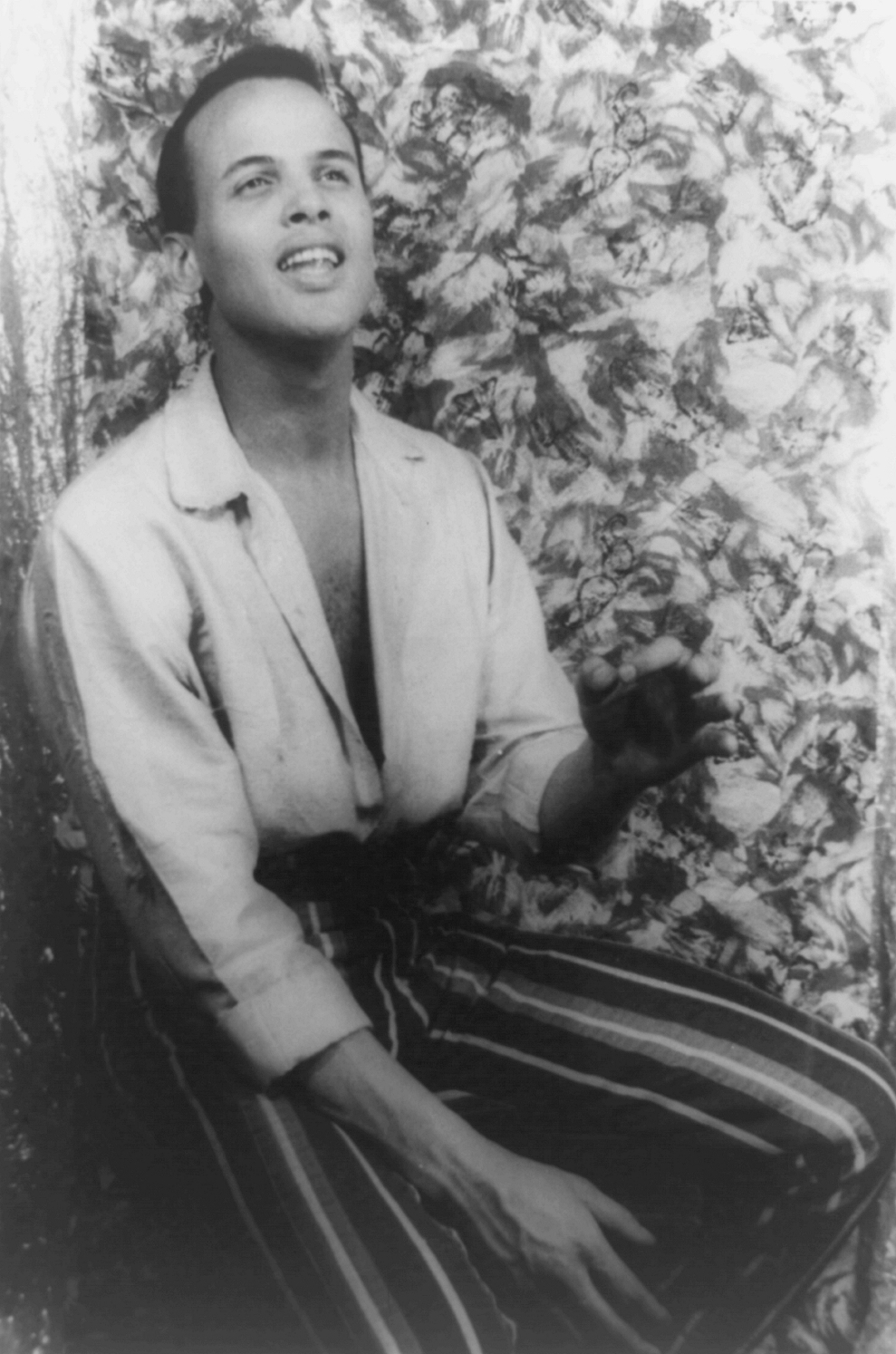
Harry Belafonte, 1954

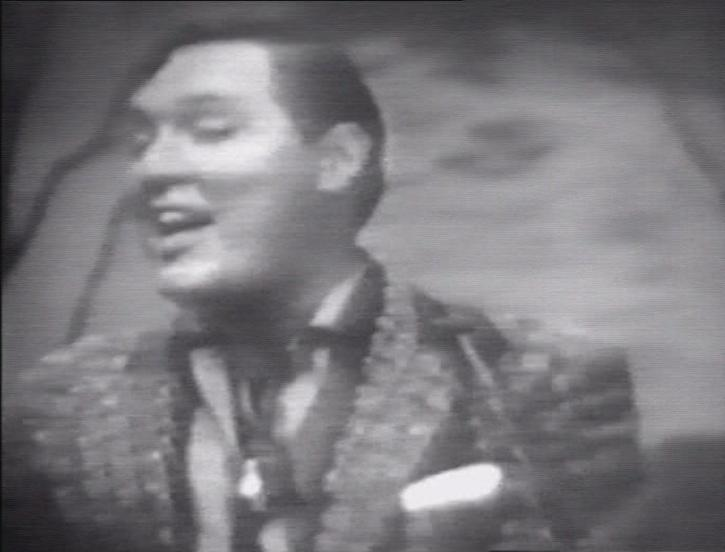
Bill Haley of Bill Haley & His Comets singing "Rock Around the Clock", 1955

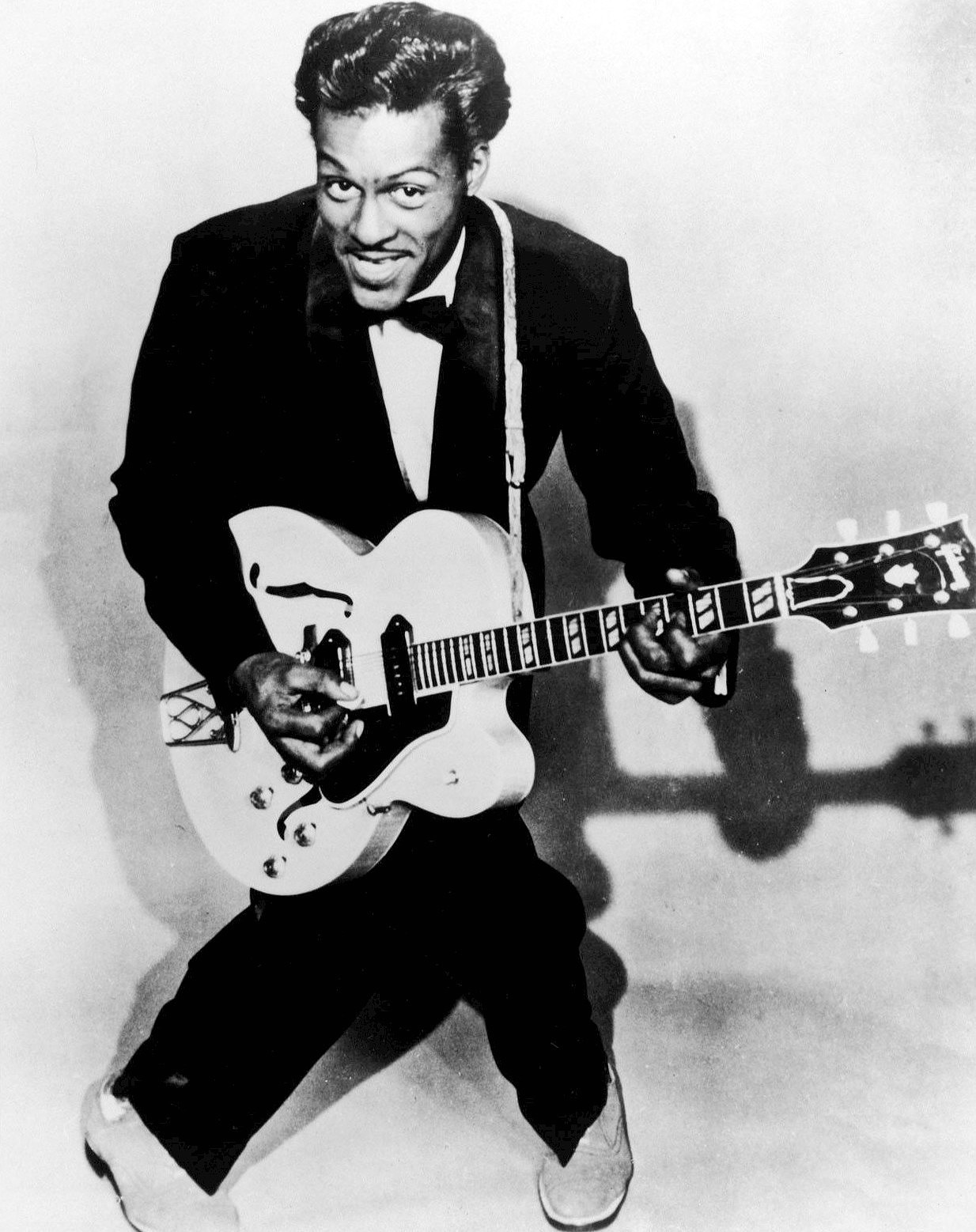
Chuck Berry, 1957

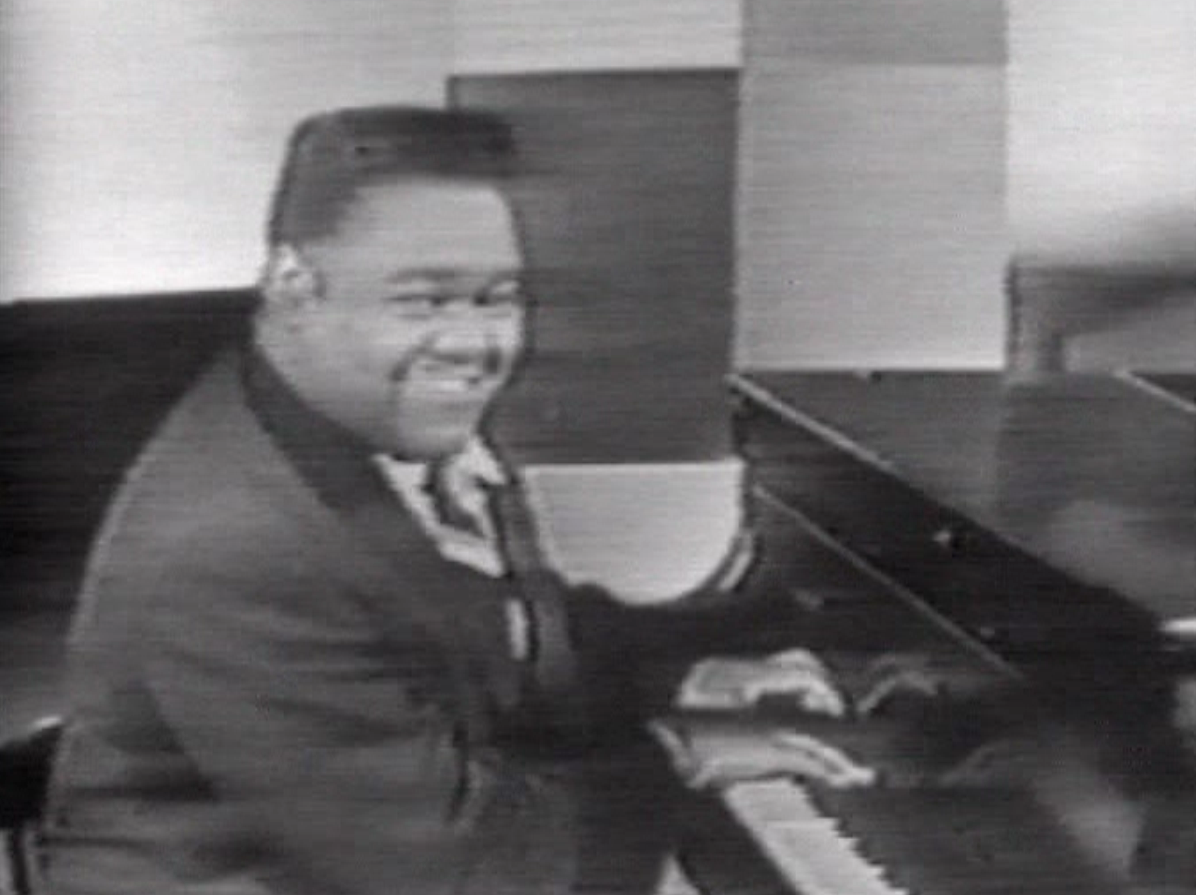
Fats Domino singing "Blueberry Hill" on The Alan Freed Show, c. 1956

=== Theater ===
Musicals were an important and popular component to the American theater scene. During the 1950s several Rodgers and Hammerstein musical shows were popular on Broadway in Manhattan, notably Carousel, Oklahoma!, South Pacific, The King and I, Flower Drum Song, and The Sound of Music. The team of Lerner and Loewe created two popular Broadway musicals during the 1950s Paint Your Wagon and My Fair Lady. Other popular musicals of the 1950s include: Guys and Dolls, Wonderful Town, Kismet, The Pajama Game, Fanny, Peter Pan, Silk Stockings, Damn Yankees, Bells Are Ringing, Candide, The Most Happy Fella, The Music Man, and West Side Story among others.

During the 1950s, some important and award-winning dramas included: The Rose Tattoo by Tennessee Williams, The Crucible by Arthur Miller, Picnic by William Inge, The Teahouse of the August Moon adapted from the novel by Vern Sneider by John Patrick, The Desperate Hours by Joseph Hayes, The Diary of Anne Frank adapted from the book by Frances Goodrich and Albert Hackett, Bus Stop by William Inge, Cat on a Hot Tin Roof by Tennessee Williams, The Chalk Garden by Enid Bagnold, Long Day's Journey Into Night by Eugene O'Neill, Separate Tables by Sir Terence Rattigan, A Raisin in the Sun by Lorraine Hansberry, No Exit by Jean-Paul Sartre, The Cocktail Party by T. S. Eliot, Witness for the Prosecution by Agatha Christie, The Waltz of the Toreadors by Jean Anouilh, Look Back in Anger by John Osborne and Sunrise at Campobello by Dore Schary, among others.

=== Cinema ===
With television's growing popularity, there was a decline in movie revenues.

With the difficulties of World War II now in the past, the decade gave birth to what might be referred to as "the suburban dream" (the typical 1950s housewife would eventually become a universally recognised stereotype). Reflecting this were films such as the melodramas by director Douglas Sirk; All That Heaven Allows (1955), There's Always Tomorrow (1956), Written on the Wind (1956) and Imitation of Life (1959). Decades later, the themes of these films would be revisited with films such as Far from Heaven (2002) and The Hours (2002).

Musicals were still an enormously popular genre during the 1950s, although over the last thirty-five years or so, the musical film has declined in popularity. Many of the musical films of the 1950s and early 1960s, were straightforward adaptations or restagings of successful stage productions, some of those include the Rodgers and Hammerstein shows: Oklahoma!, Carousel, The King and I, and South Pacific. Other popular musicals of the 1950s include Love Me Tender which starred Elvis Presley, High Society, An American in Paris, Singin' in the Rain, Guys and Dolls, The Band Wagon, Show Boat, Seven Brides for Seven Brothers, Gigi, Daddy Long Legs, Funny Face, Calamity Jane, Porgy and Bess, Carmen Jones, and many others.

The Walt Disney Studios enjoyed a decade of prosperity with animated feature-length films Cinderella, Alice in Wonderland, Peter Pan, Lady and the Tramp (Disney's first wide-screen animated film), and Sleeping Beauty. The studio began producing live-action period and historical films such as The Sword and the Rose, Davy Crockett, King of the Wild Frontier, Johnny Tremain, Old Yeller, Light in the Forest, Tonka, and Darby O'Gill and the Little People. The studio produced its first live-action contemporary comedy The Shaggy Dog in 1959 with Disney teen stars Annette Funicello and Tommy Kirk.

Established stars appeared in films that have come to be regarded as classics such as Sunset Boulevard (Gloria Swanson), and (William Holden), All About Eve (Bette Davis), Vertigo (James Stewart) and (Kim Novak), Some Like It Hot (Marilyn Monroe, Tony Curtis, and Jack Lemmon), High Noon (Gary Cooper and Grace Kelly), The Searchers (John Wayne), North by Northwest (Cary Grant), Lust for Life (Kirk Douglas) and (Anthony Quinn), The Man in the Gray Flannel Suit (Gregory Peck), The Bridge on the River Kwai (Alec Guinness), Singin' in the Rain (Gene Kelly and Donald O'Connor), White Christmas (Bing Crosby), and Ben-Hur (Charlton Heston), a film which holds (with Titanic and The Lord of the Rings: The Return of the King) a record for most Academy Awards. The Stanislavski system's theater-orientated, yet organic approach to acting influenced the work of film actors including Montgomery Clift, Marlon Brando James Dean, and Paul Newman. Brando's performances in On the Waterfront, The Wild One, and A Streetcar Named Desire influenced sales of T-shirts, leather jackets, and motorcycles.

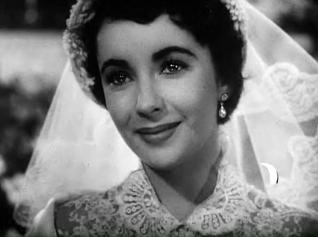
Elizabeth Taylor in Father of the Bride, 1950

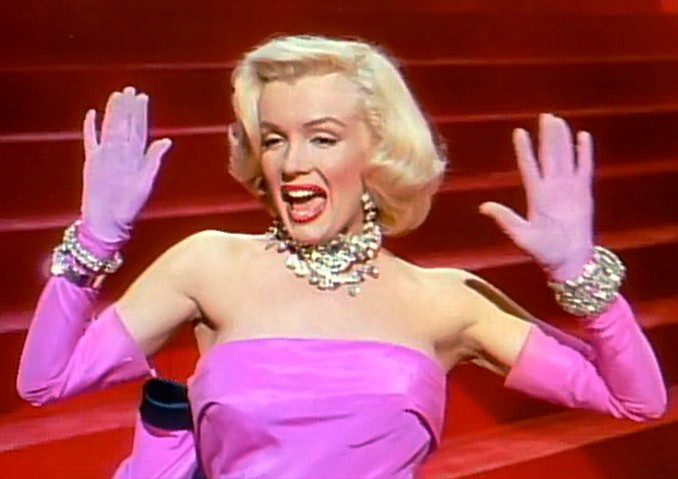
Marilyn Monroe performing "Diamonds Are a Girl's Best Friend" in Gentlemen Prefer Blondes, 1953

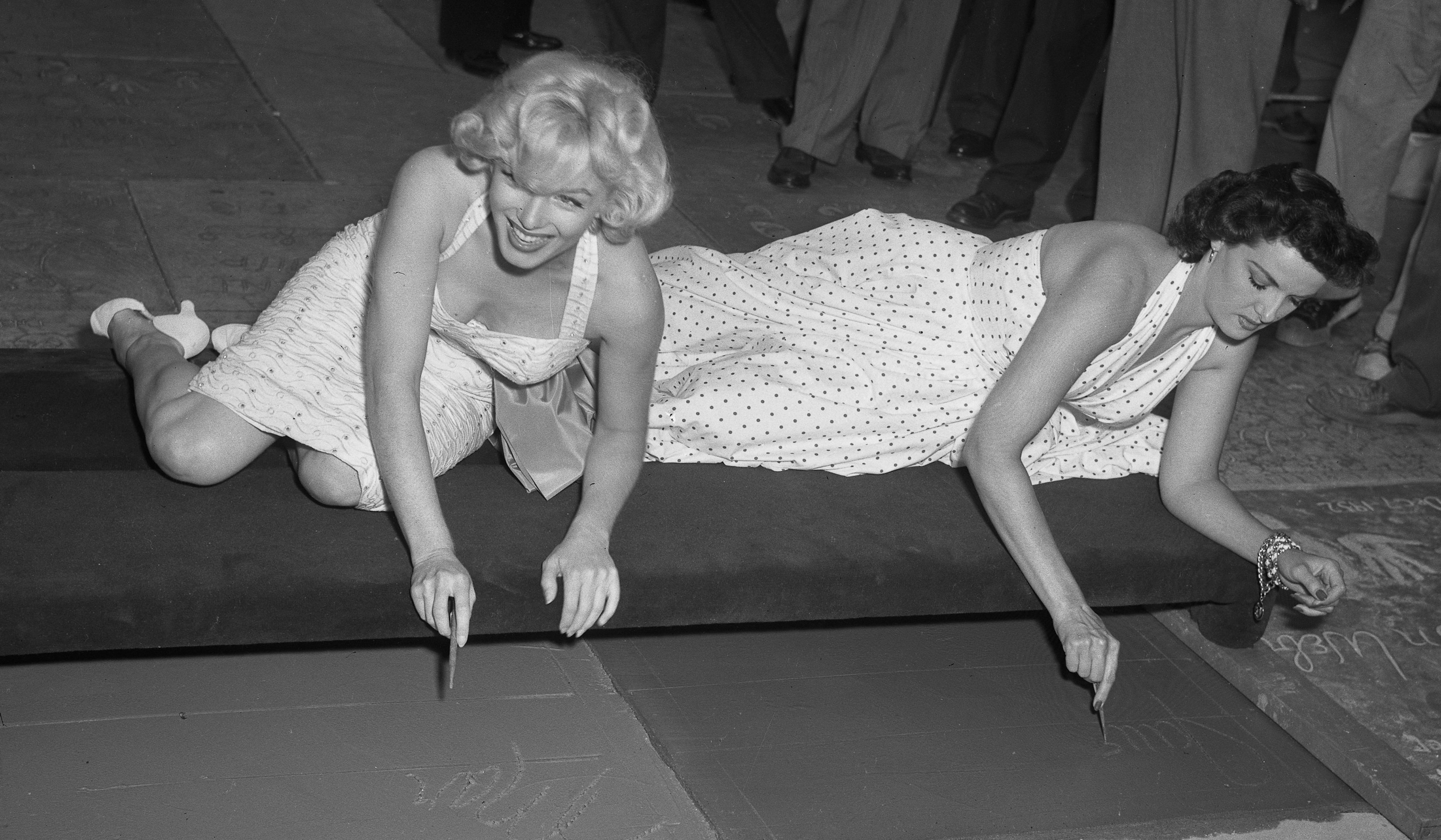
Marilyn Monroe and Jane Russell putting signatures, hand and foot prints in wet concrete at Grauman's Chinese Theater, 1953

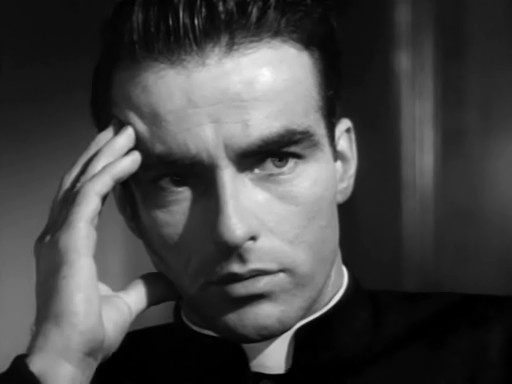
Montgomery Clift in I Confess, 1953

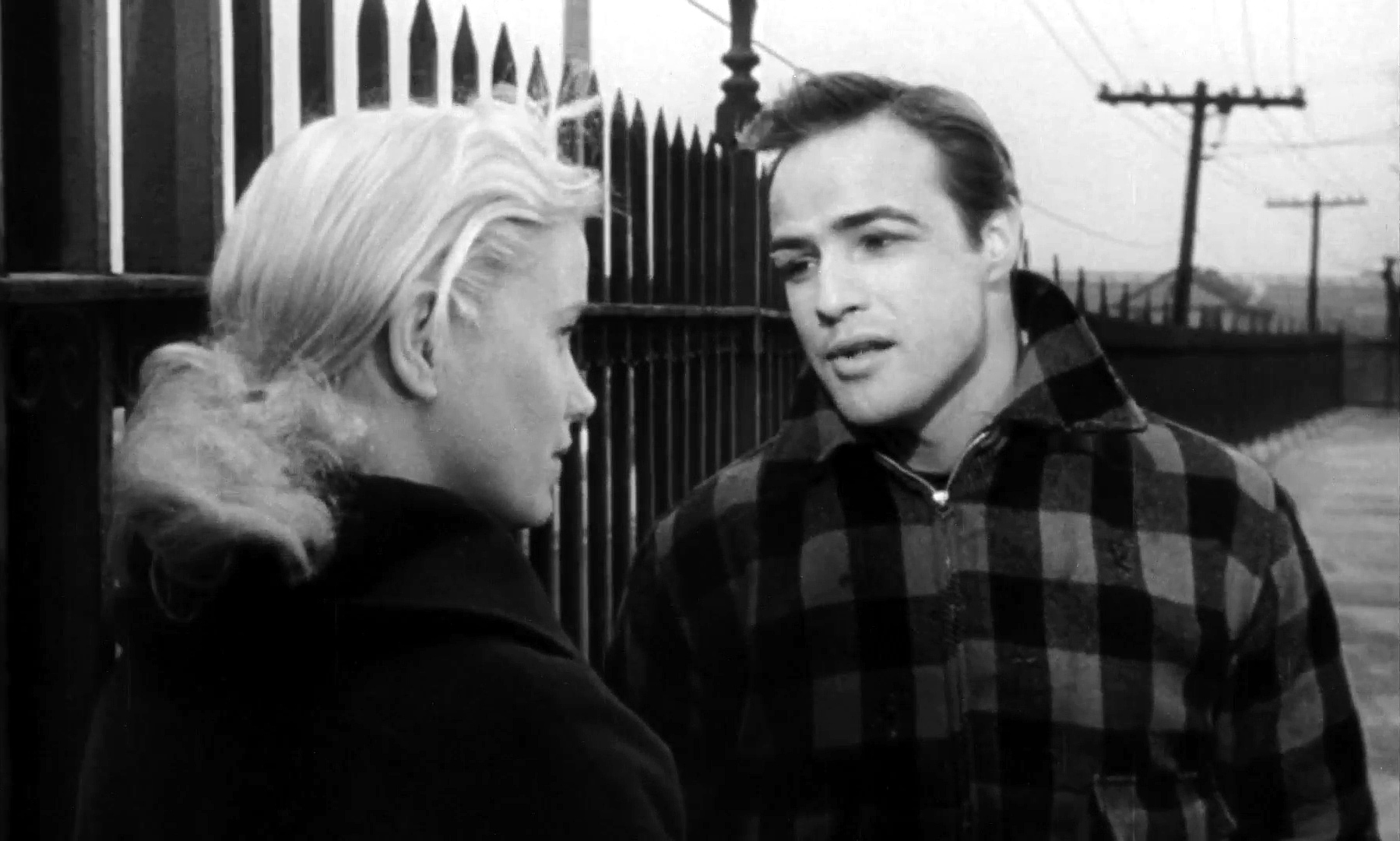
Marlon Brando with Eva Marie Saint in the trailer for On the Waterfront, 1954

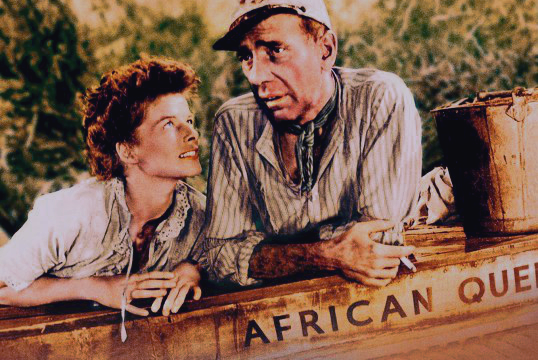
Humphrey Bogart and Katharine Hepburn in The African Queen, 1951

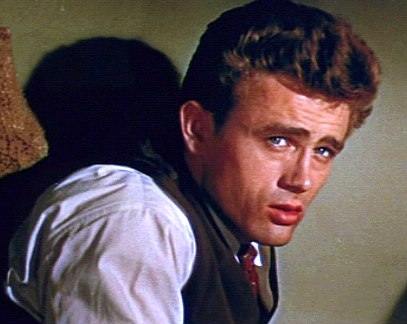
James Dean as Cal in East of Eden, 1955

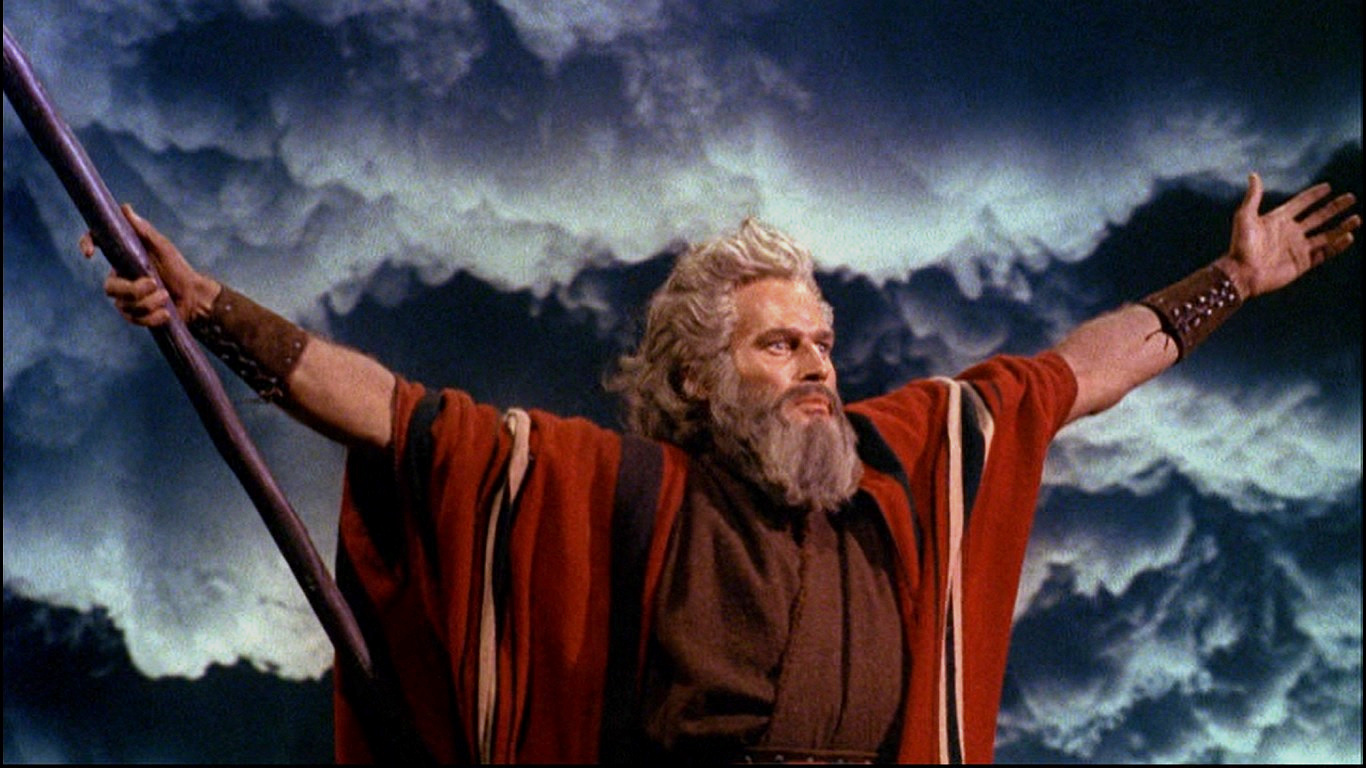
Charlton Heston in The Ten Commandments, 1956

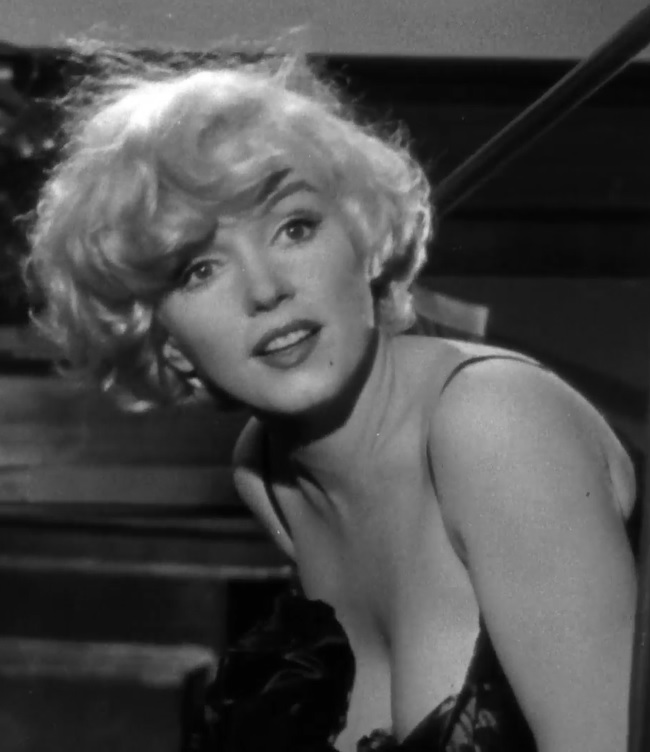
Marilyn Monroe in Some Like It Hot, 1959

=== Comics ===
Superhero comics during the 1950s, though not as popular as the previous decade (or the next), were still abundant. Some of the titles DC Comics published include Superman, Superboy Comics, Adventure Comics (Superboy stories), Action Comics (Superman stories), Batman, Detective Comics (Batman stories) amongst others. World's Finest Comics featured stories with Superman, Batman and Robin, and other superheroes combined. Superman's sweetheart Lois Lane received her own title also. Timely Comics, the 1940s predecessor of Marvel Comics, had million-selling titles that featured the Human Torch, the Sub-Mariner, and Captain America.

Satire and humor during the 1950s were popular and abundant. MAD, the American humor magazine, was founded by editor Harvey Kurtzman and publisher William Gaines in 1952. Originally launched as a comic book before it became a magazine, it was widely imitated and influential, impacting not only satirical media but the entire cultural landscape of the 20th century. Other Mad comics imitators during the 1950s included Cracked, Sick, Crazy, and Panic, produced by future Mad editor Al Feldstein.

=== Television ===
Television, a commodity virtually unheard of during the Second World War, was now prevalent in most American homes by the mid-to-late 1950s. Television also increasingly became a medium for which to advertise products.

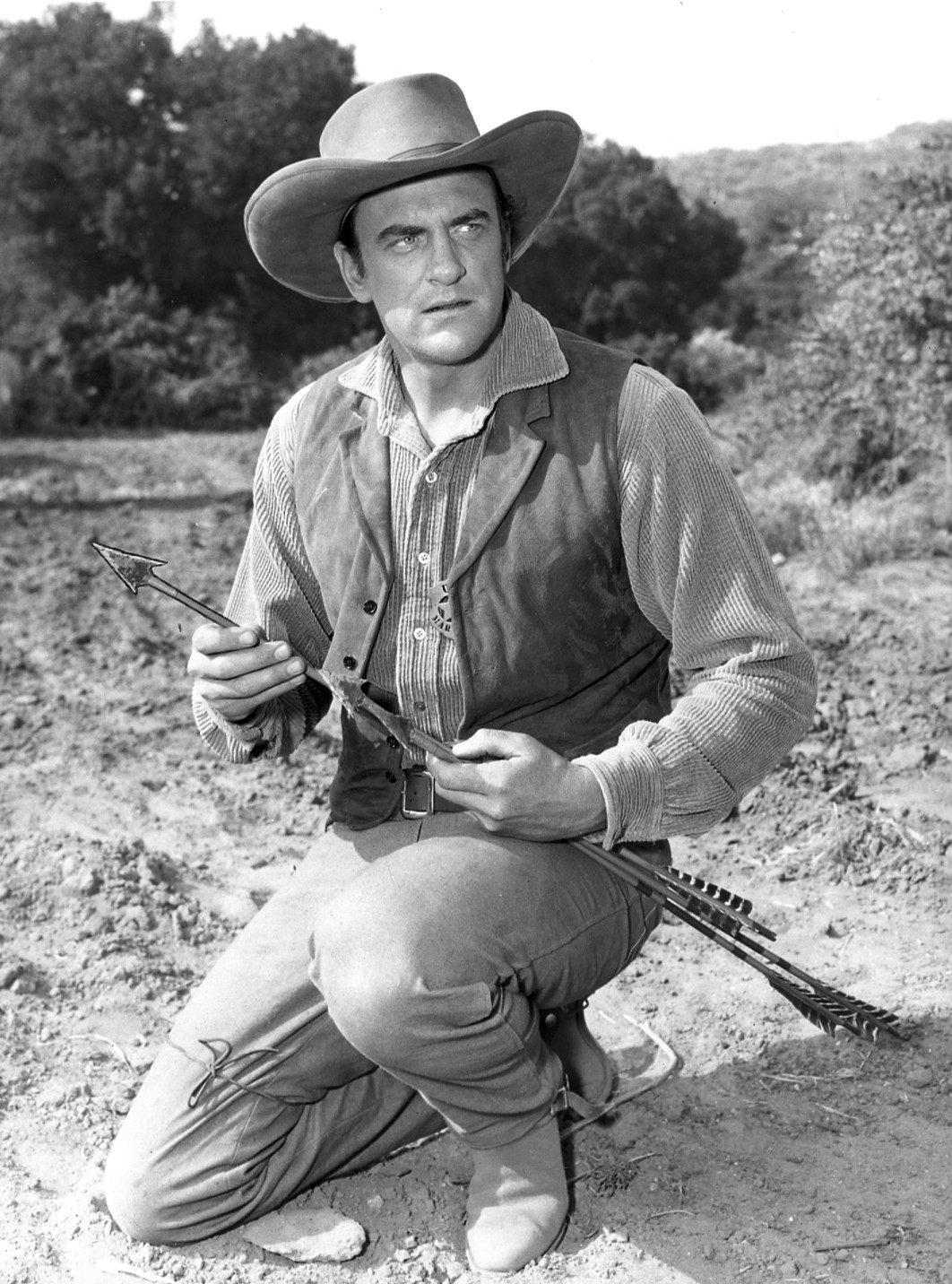
James Arness as Matt Dillon in Gunsmoke, 1956

=== Notable sports figures ===
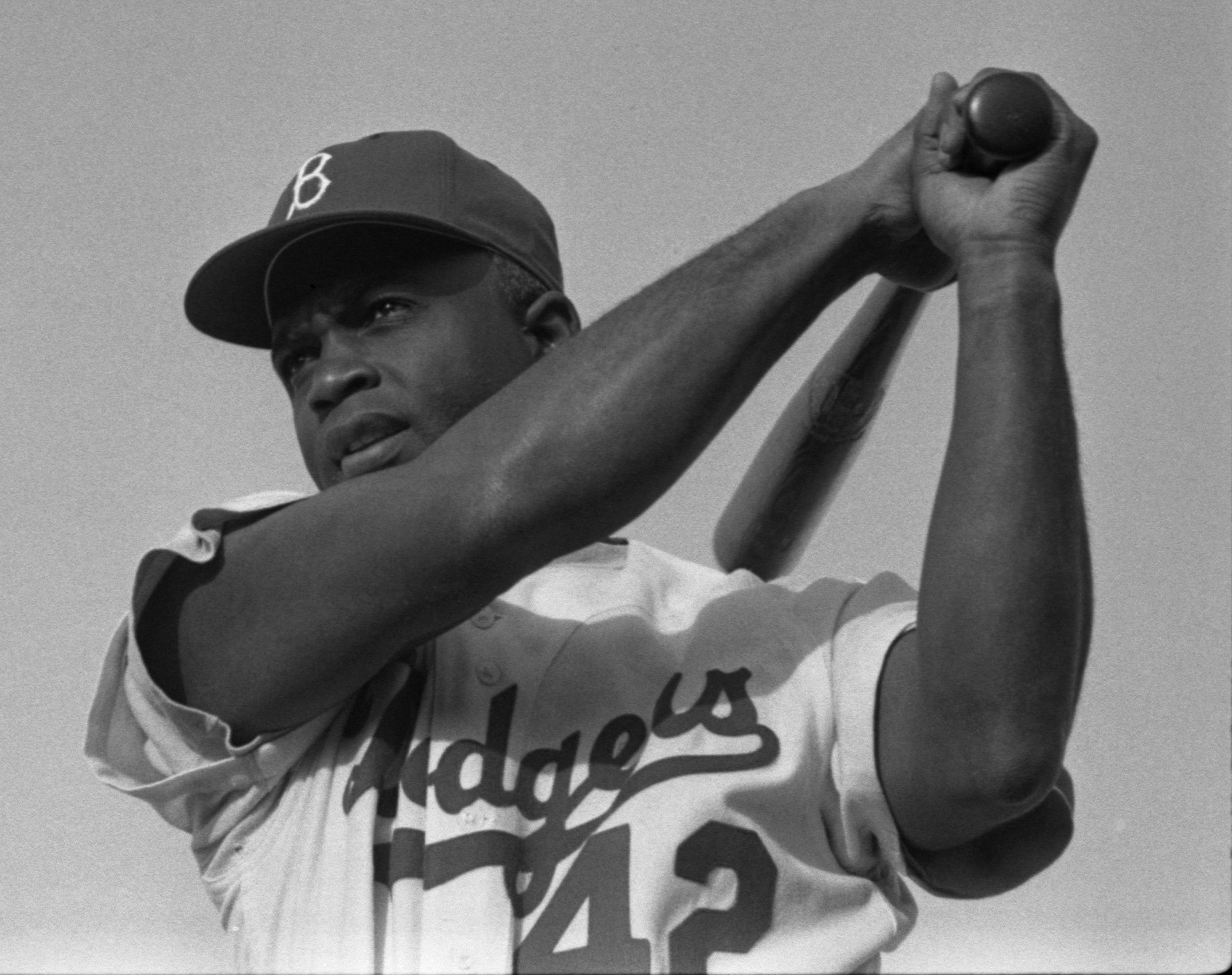
Jackie Robinson, Brooklyn Dodgers third baseman, 1954

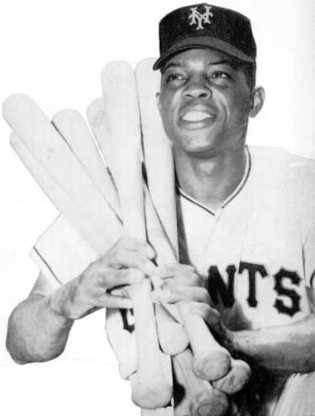
Willie Mays, New York Giants centerfielder, 1954

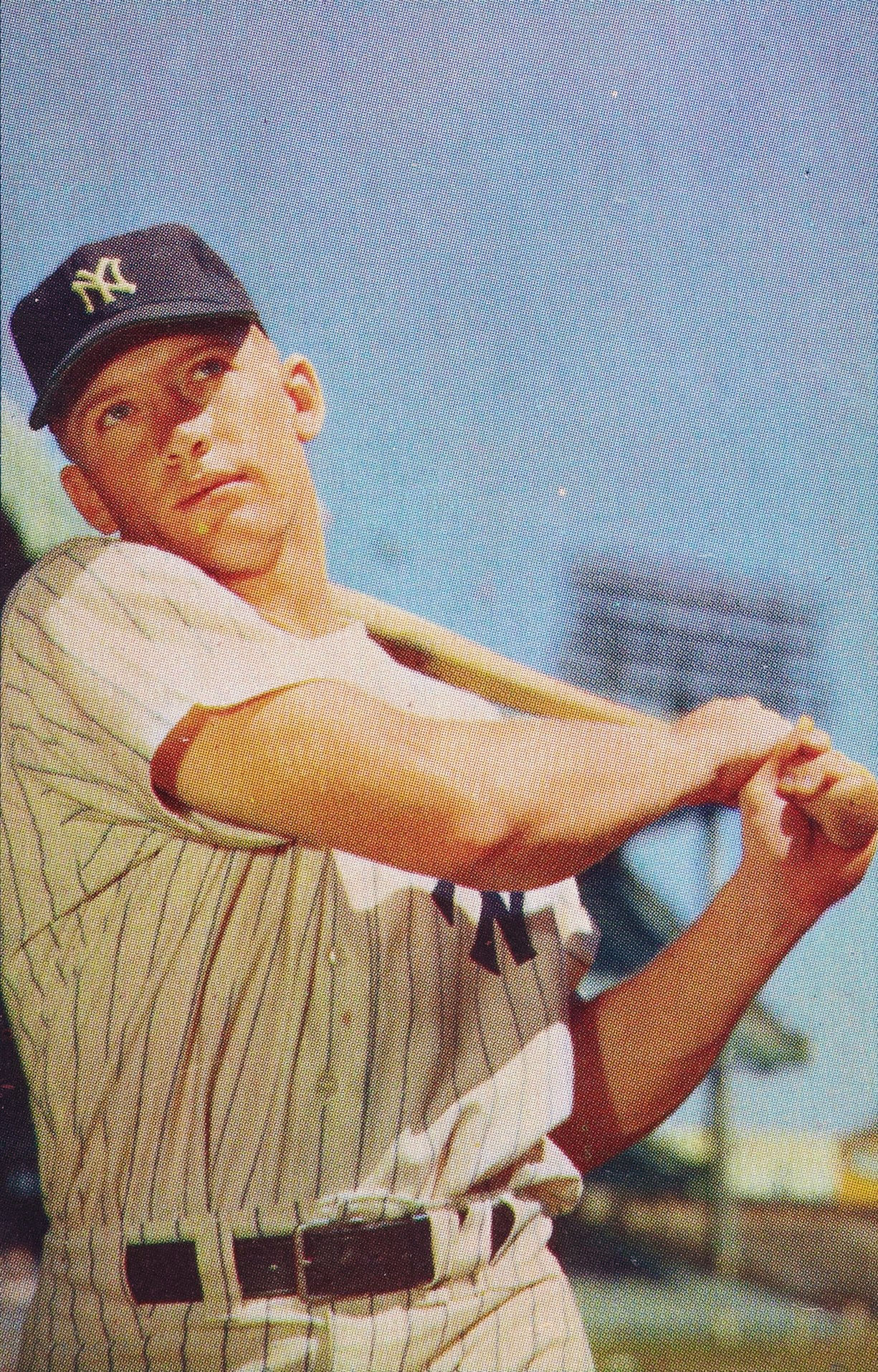
Mickey Mantle, New York Yankees centerfielder, 1953

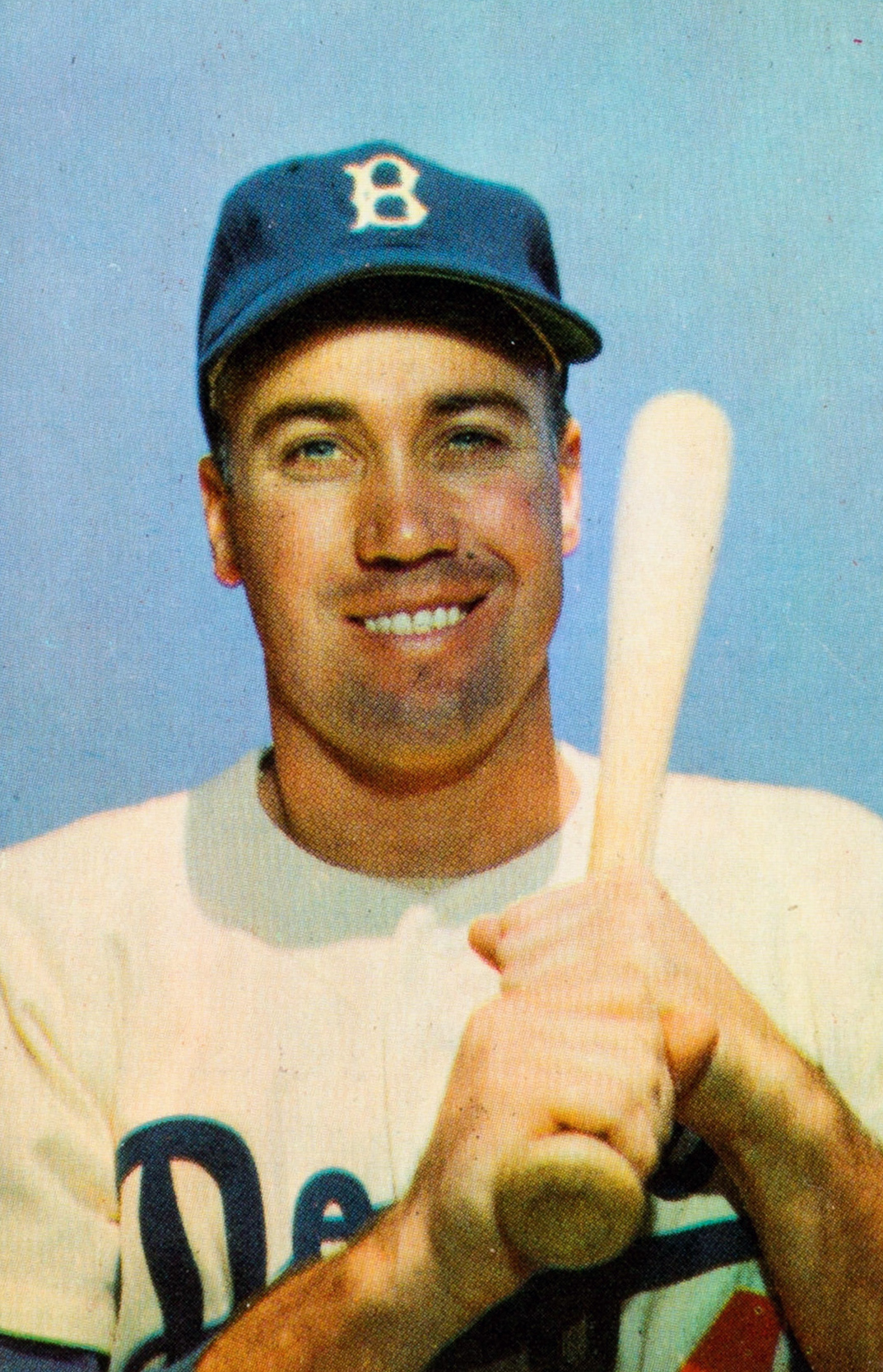
Duke Snider, Brooklyn Dodgers centerfielder, c. 1953

- Henry Aaron (baseball player)
- Ernie Banks (baseball player)
- Carmen Basilio (boxing)
- Yogi Berra (baseball player)
- Jim Brown (football player)
- Roy Campanella (baseball player)
- Ezzard Charles (boxing)
- Roberto Clemente (baseball player)
- Maureen Connolly (tennis player)
- Bob Cousy (basketball player)
- Harrison Dillard (track and field athlete)
- Joe DiMaggio (baseball player)
- Whitey Ford (baseball player)
- Ben Hogan (golf)
- Ingemar Johansson (boxing)
- Al Kaline (baseball player)
- Mickey Mantle (baseball player)
- Rocky Marciano (boxer)
- Eddie Mathews (baseball player)
- Willie Mays (baseball player)
- Archie Moore (boxing)
- Stan Musial (baseball player)
- Bobo Olson (boxing)
- Floyd Patterson (boxing)
- Bob Pettit (basketball player)
- Jackie Robinson (baseball player)
- Frank Robinson (baseball player)
- Sugar Ray Robinson (boxer)
- Wilma Rudolph (Track and field)
- Bill Russell (basketball player)
- Sam Snead (golf)
- Duke Snider (baseball player)
- Warren Spahn (baseball player)
- Casey Stengel (baseball manager, former player)
- Chuck Taylor
- Johnny Unitas (football)
- Ted Williams (baseball player)

== Civil rights movement ==
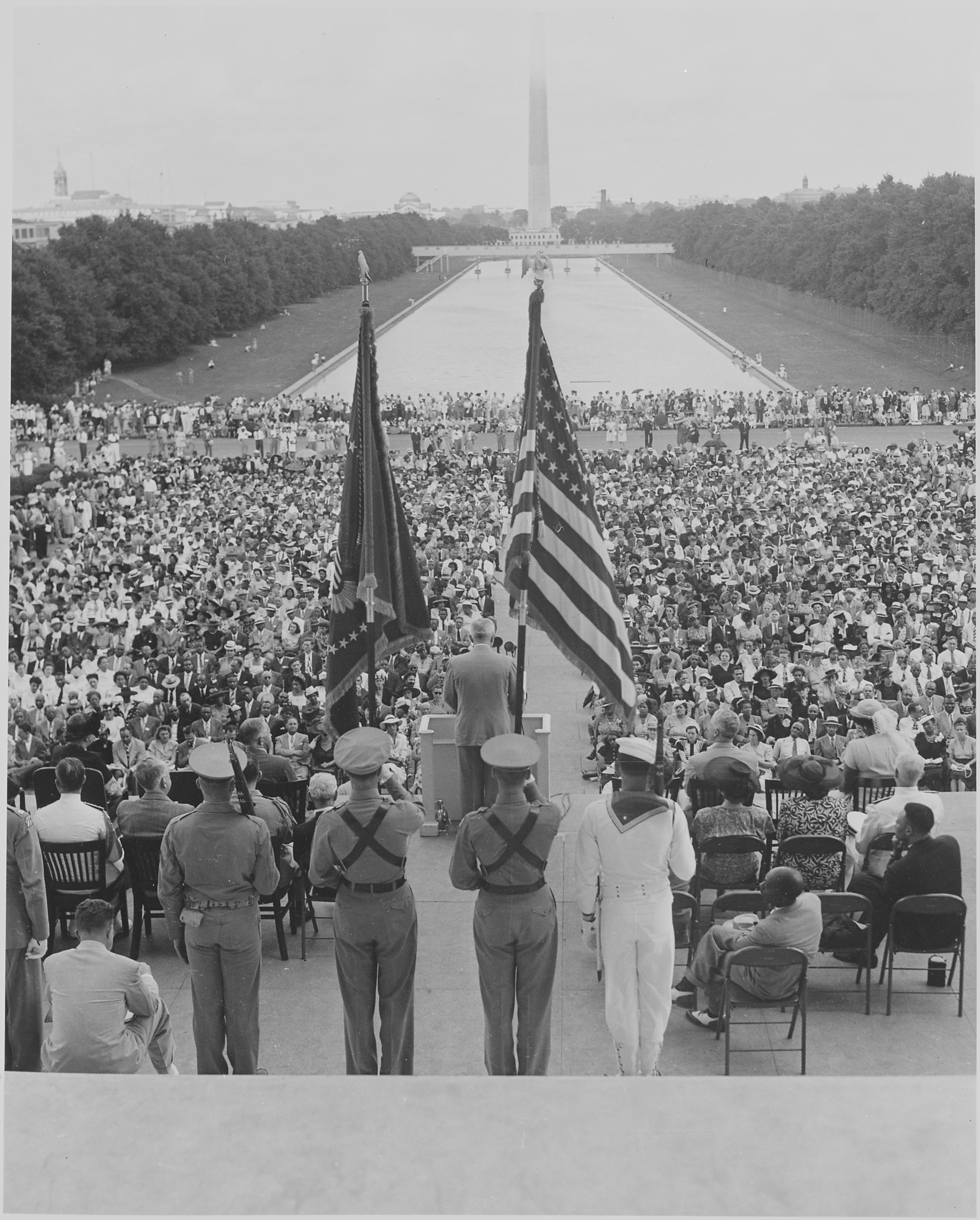
President Harry S. Truman addresses the NAACP at its 38th annual conference on the steps of the Lincoln Memorial, June 29, 1947.

Following the end of Reconstruction, many states adopted restrictive Jim Crow laws which enforced segregation of the races and the second-class status of African Americans. The Supreme Court in Plessy v. Ferguson (1896) accepted segregation as constitutional. Voting rights discrimination remained widespread through the 1950s. Fewer than 10% voted in the Deep South, although a larger proportion voted in the border states, and blacks in the northern urban areas had shifted wholesale to the Democrats during the New Deal era.

The return of many black soldiers following the end of World War II led a wave of racial violence to sweep through the south in 1945–46, becoming a national issue and prompting the Truman administration to focus increasingly on civil rights. The Fair Employment Practice Committee had been established in June 1941 via executive order by President Roosevelt to prevent discriminatory practices by the federal government in all war-related work; following the end of the war, Truman unsuccessfully petitioned to maintain a permanent committee. In 1947, the President's Committee on Civil Rights drafted a report titled, To Secure These Rights, which outlined a ten-point agenda on civil rights reform. In 1948, as part of the Fair Deal, President Truman proposed a civil rights agenda to congress which included the elimination of the poll tax, a federal lynching ban, and the establishment of a civil rights division in the Department of Justice. While most of these proposals were rejected by Southern Democrats in Congress, Truman signed Executive orders 9980 and 9981 in July 1948, which outlawed segregation in the federal government and armed forces, respectively.

In September 1957, President Eisenhower signed into law the Civil Rights Act of 1957, the first major civil rights legislation in nearly a century, paving way to climactic federal civil rights legislation in the 1960s.

=== Brown v. Board of Education and "massive resistance" ===
In the early days of the Civil Rights Movement, litigation and lobbying were the focus of integration efforts. The U.S. Supreme Court decisions in Brown v. Board of Education of Topeka (1954); Powell v. Alabama (1932); Smith v. Allwright (1944); Shelley v. Kraemer (1948); Sweatt v. Painter (1950); and McLaurin v. Oklahoma State Regents (1950) led to a shift in tactics, and from 1955 to 1966, nonviolent direct action was the strategy—primarily bus boycotts, sit-ins, freedom rides, and social movements.

Brown v. Board of Education of Topeka was a landmark case of the United States Supreme Court which explicitly outlawed segregated public education facilities for blacks and whites, ruling so on the grounds that the doctrine of "separate but equal" public education could never truly provide black Americans with facilities of the same standards available to white Americans. One hundred and one members of the United States House of Representatives and 19 Senators signed "The Southern Manifesto" condemning the Supreme Court decision as unconstitutional.

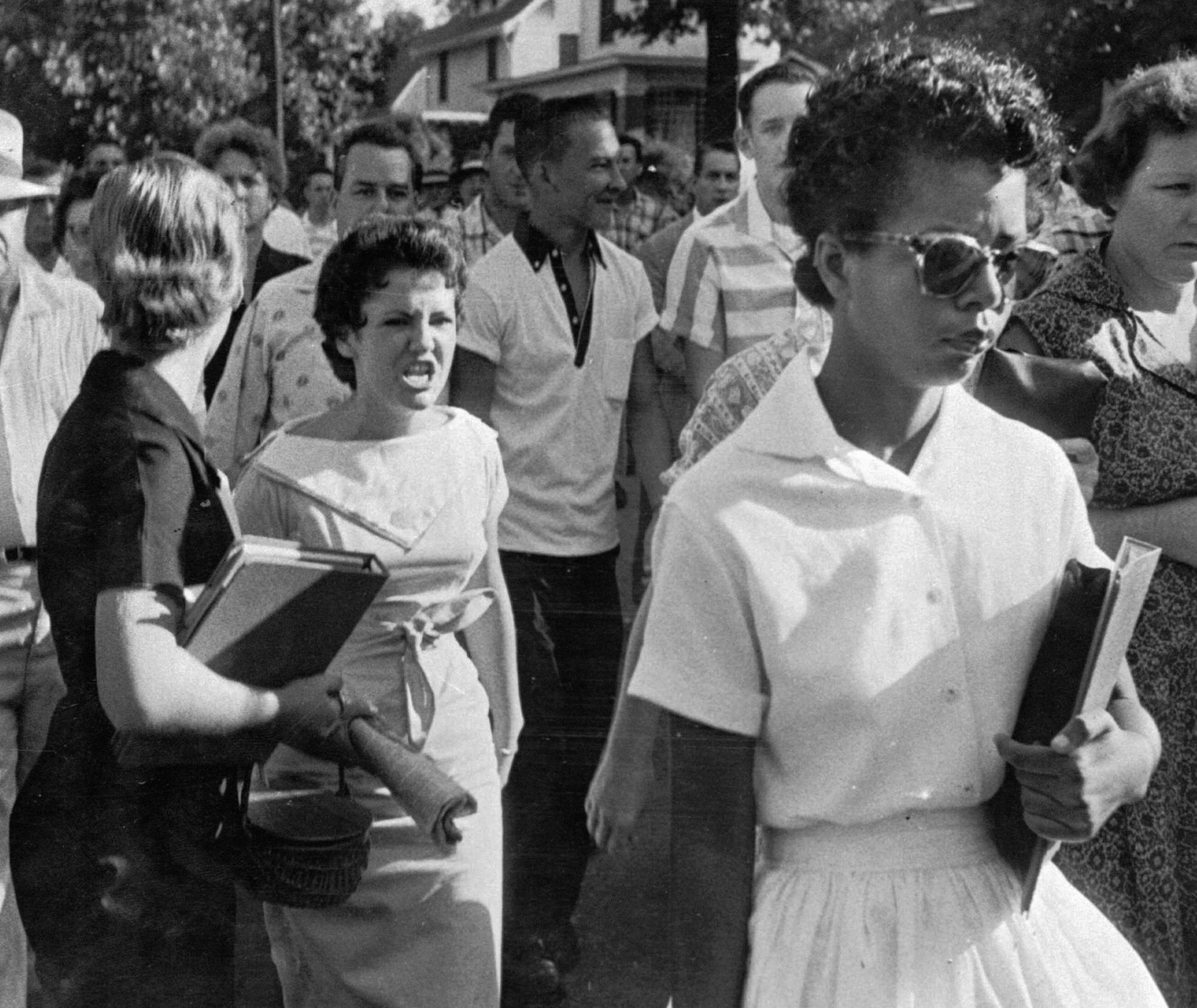
Elizabeth Eckford, an African-American high school student, is jeered while entering Little Rock Central High School following its racial integration in 1957.

Governor Orval Eugene Faubus (Democrat) of Arkansas used the Arkansas National Guard to prevent school integration at Little Rock Central High School in 1957. President Eisenhower (Republican) nationalized state forces and sent in the US Army to enforce federal court orders. Governors Ross Barnett of Mississippi and George Wallace of Alabama physically blocked school doorways at their respective states' universities. Birmingham's public safety commissioner Eugene T. "Bull" Connor advocated violence against freedom riders and ordered fire hoses and police dogs turned on demonstrators during the 1963 Birmingham Children's Crusade. Sheriff Jim Clark of Dallas County, Alabama, loosed his deputies during the 1965 "Bloody Sunday" event of the Selma to Montgomery march, injuring many of the marchers and personally menacing other protesters. Police all across the South arrested civil rights activists on trumped-up charges.

=== Civil rights organizations ===
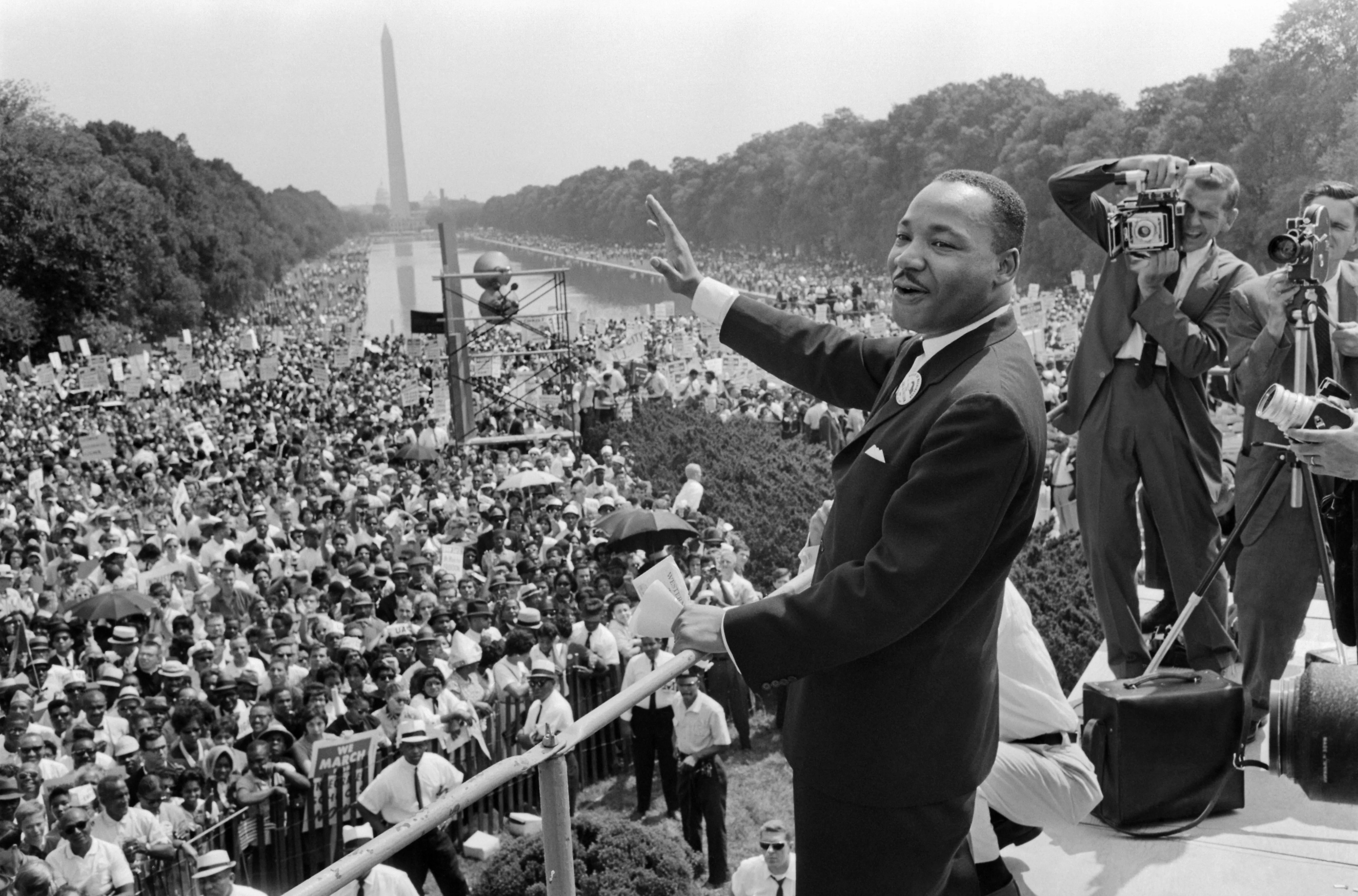
Martin Luther King Jr. speaking in Washington, D.C. at the March on Washington for Jobs and Freedom in 1963

Although they had white supporters and sympathizers, the Civil Rights Movement was designed, led, organized, and manned by African-Americans, who placed themselves and their families on the front lines in the struggle for freedom. Their heroism was brought home to every American through newspaper, and later, television reports as their peaceful marches and demonstrations were violently attacked by law enforcement. Officers used batons, bullwhips, fire hoses, police dogs, and mass arrests to intimidate the protesters. The second characteristic of the movement is that it was not monolithic, led by one or two men. Rather it was a dispersed, grass-roots campaign that attacked segregation in many different places using many different tactics. While some groups and individuals within the civil rights movement—such as Malcolm X—advocated Black Power, black separatism, or even armed resistance, the majority of participants remained committed to the principles of nonviolence, a deliberate decision by an oppressed minority to abstain from violence for political gain. Using nonviolent strategies, civil rights activists took advantage of emerging national network-news reporting, especially television, to capture national attention.

The leadership role of black churches in the movement was a natural extension of their structure and function. They offered members an opportunity to exercise roles denied them in society. Throughout history, the black church served as a place of worship and also as a base for powerful ministers, such as Congressman Adam Clayton Powell in New York City. The most prominent clergyman in the Civil Rights Movement was Martin Luther King Jr. and the top strategist was James Bevel; as Time magazine's 1963 "Man of the Year", King showed tireless personal commitment to black freedom and his strong leadership won him worldwide acclaim and the 1964 Nobel Peace Prize.

Students and seminarians in both the South and the North played key roles in every phase of the movement. Church and student-led movements, such as the Nashville Student Movement, developed their own organizational and sustaining structures. The Southern Christian Leadership Conference (SCLC), founded in 1957, coordinated and raised funds, mostly from northern sources, for local protests and for the training of black leaders. The Student Nonviolent Coordinating Committee, or SNCC, founded in 1957, developed the "jail-no-bail" strategy. SNCC's role was to develop and link sit-in campaigns and to help organize freedom rides, voter registration drives, and other protest activities. These three new groups often joined forces with existing organizations such as the National Association for the Advancement of Colored People (NAACP), founded in 1909, the Congress of Racial Equality (CORE), founded in 1942, and the National Urban League. The NAACP and its director, Roy Wilkins, provided legal counsel for jailed demonstrators, helped raise bail, and continued to test segregation and discrimination in the courts as it had been doing for half a century. CORE initiated the 1961 Freedom Rides which involved many SNCC members, and CORE's leader James Farmer later became executive secretary of SNCC. The administration of President John F. Kennedy supported enforcement of desegregation in schools and public facilities. Attorney General Robert F. Kennedy brought more than 50 lawsuits in four states to secure black Americans' right to vote. However, FBI director J. Edgar Hoover, concerned about possible communist influence in the civil rights movement and personally antagonistic to King, used the FBI to discredit King and other civil rights leaders.

In 1948, Malcolm X became a member of Elijah Muhammad's Nation of Islam (NOI), where he emerged as an active organizer and spokesperson. The group emphasized Black economic independence and self-reliance and rejected the racial hierarchies that characterized mid-twentieth-century American society.

According to some scholars, the Nation of Islam has reinterpreted prevailing racial hierarchies in the United States by emphasizing a global view that contrasts positive associations with Black identity and negative associations with whiteness. Historians have described this as a reversal of dominant racial value systems in mid-twentieth-century America.

== Presidential administrations ==
=== Truman: 1945–1953 ===
Truman, a self-educated farm boy from Missouri, stood in sharp contrast to the urbane and imperious Roosevelt who kept personal control of all major decisions. Truman was a folksy, unassuming president who relied on his cabinet, remarking "The buck stops here" and "If you can't stand the heat, you better get out of the kitchen." He replaced nearly all of Roosevelt's cabinet, often with old friends from his Senate days.

=== Truman administration and early postwar period ===
An "accidental" president widely seen as a creature of the Teddy Pendergast machine in St. Louis, Harry Truman was not initially popular. Rationing of goods was officially ended in October 1945 but the transition back to a peacetime economy was difficult and marred by high inflation, raw materials shortages, serious labor strikes, and racial tensions—much like happened in 1919, white servicemen returning home from the war were unhappy at blacks being given their jobs in their absence. In the 1946 midterm elections, the Republican Party managed sweeping electoral gains and controlled both houses of Congress for the first time in 16 years via the electoral slogan "Had enough?" The new 80th Congress convened in early 1947 and promptly began clipping the wings of the New Deal. The anti-union Taft-Hartley Act was passed along with the 22nd Amendment, which barred future presidents from serving more than two terms. Leftover wartime taxes and other regulations were lowered or removed.

Truman's prospects in the 1948 presidential election seemed dim, but he pulled off a surprise upset win via an aggressive populist campaign focused mainly on his home region in the Midwest, and aided by the uninspired Republican candidate New York governor and 1944 presidential candidate Thomas E. Dewey. The brief Republican control of Congress ended and Democrats regained both houses in downballot races. The House remained under Democrat control until 1995 with the exception of two years in the 1950s and the Senate would remain Democrat for most of 1949 to 1994. However, the political climate in the postwar years had decidedly shifted back to the center and away from the leftism of the New Deal era. Americans had tired of top-down government planning and there was a growing distrust of Soviet intentions and the large number of Soviet spies who infiltrated Washington D.C. during the FDR era. The postwar Congressional coalitions were more conservative and resisted some of Truman's plans, including proposals for European-style social welfare programs.

The Kefauver hearings about country-wide organized crime and corruption, were held between 1950 and 1951. The Kefauver Committee, officially the Senate Special Committee to Investigate Crime in Interstate Commerce, held all of America's attention. It was the first committee made up of senators from around the country organized to not only gain a better understanding of how to fight organized crime, but also to expose organized crime for the conglomerate empire that it was. Headed by Estes Kefauver, the committee traveled the country, investigating all levels of corruption.

The defeat of America's wartime ally in the Chinese Civil War brought a hostile Communist regime to China under Mao Zedong. Soon the US became bogged down fighting China in the Korean War, 1950–53. Corruption in Truman's administration, which was linked to cabinet-level appointees and senior White House staff, was a central issue in the 1952 presidential campaign. Truman's third term hopes were dashed by a poor showing in the 1952 primaries. Republican Dwight D. Eisenhower, the famous wartime general, won a landslide in the 1952 presidential election by campaigning against Truman's failures in terms of "Communism, Korea and Corruption."

=== Eisenhower: 1953–1961 ===
Eisenhower had been a prospective presidential candidate since the end of World War II, and although he publicly announced himself a Republican, he declined the party's offers to run in 1948. However, four years later, he reconsidered, in part because he believed the Democratic Party had had a monopoly on power for too long (control of the White House for 19 straight years and Congress for 16 of the last 19 years) and it was necessary to restore a proper two party balance. Also, the GOP in their desperation to regain power had begun supporting controversial figures such as Joseph McCarthy. As a national hero, Eisenhower carried every major demographic bloc and all states outside the South in the 1952 presidential election. He ended the Korean War, maintained the peace in Asia and the Middle East, and worked smoothly with NATO allies in Europe while keeping the policy of containing Communism rather than trying to roll it back.

The economy was generally healthy, apart from a sharp economic recession in 1958. Eisenhower remained popular and largely avoided partisan politics; he was reelected by a landslide in 1956. While frugal in budget matters he expanded Social Security and did not try to repeal the remaining New Deal programs.

The US federal government authorized the Interstate Highway Act in June 1956, and construction had begun by the fall of that same year. The originally planned set of highways took decades to complete. The interstate highway system (using a tax on gasoline) dramatically improved the nation's transportation infrastructure. In long-term perspective the interstate highway system was a remarkable success, that has done much to sustain Eisenhower's positive reputation. Although there were later objections to the negative impact of clearing neighborhoods in cities, the system has been well received. The railroad system for passengers and freight declined sharply, but the trucking expanded dramatically and the cost of shipping and travel fell sharply. Suburbanization became possible, with the rapid growth of easily accessible, larger, cheaper housing than was available in the overcrowded central cities. Tourism dramatically expanded as well, creating a demand for more service stations, motels, restaurants and visitor attractions. There was much more long-distance movement to the Sunbelt for winter vacations, or for permanent relocation, with convenient access to visits to relatives back home. In rural areas, towns and small cities off the grid lost out as shoppers followed the interstate, and new factories were located near them.

In both foreign and domestic policy Eisenhower remained on friendly terms with the Democrats, who regained Congress in 1954 and made large gains in 1958. His farewell address to the nation warned of the dangers of a growing "military–industrial complex."

=== Kennedy: 1961-1963 ===
==== 1960 presidential election ====
The very close 1960 election pitted Republican Vice President Richard Nixon against the Democratic Senator John F. Kennedy of Massachusetts. Historians have explained Kennedy's victory in terms of an economic recession, the numerical dominance of 17 million more registered Democrats than Republicans, the votes that Kennedy gained among Catholics practically matched the votes Nixon gained among Protestants, Kennedy's better organization and superior campaigning skills. Kennedy used his large, well-funded campaign organization to win the nomination, secure endorsements, and with the aid of the last of the big-city bosses, to get out the vote in the big cities. He relied on Johnson to hold the South and used television effectively. Kennedy was the first Catholic to run for president since Al Smith's ill-fated campaign in 1928. Voters were polarized on religious grounds, but Kennedy's election was a transforming event for Catholics, who finally realized they were accepted in America, and it marked the virtual end of anti-Catholicism as a political force.

==== Presidency ====
The Kennedy Family had long been leaders of the Irish Catholic wing of the Democratic Party; JFK was middle-of-the-road or liberal on domestic issues and conservative on foreign policy, sending military forces into Cuba and Vietnam. The Kennedy style called for youth, dynamism, vigor and an intellectual approach to aggressive new policies in foreign affairs. The downside was his inexperience in foreign affairs, standing in stark contrast to the vast experience of the president he replaced. He is best known for his call to civic virtue: "And so, my fellow Americans: ask not what your country can do for you - ask what you can do for your country." Kennedy was largely unsuccessful in domestic legislation and his initiatives were blocked by Congressional Democrats, many of them Southerners.

===== Assassination =====
President Kennedy was assassinated in Dallas, Texas, on November 22, 1963, by Lee Harvey Oswald. The event proved to be one of the greatest psychological shocks to the American people in the 20th century and led to Kennedy being revered as a martyr and hero.

=== Johnson, 1963–1969 ===
After Kennedy's assassination, Vice President Lyndon Baines Johnson served out the remainder of the term, using appeals to finish the job that Kennedy had started to pass a remarkable package of liberal legislation that he called the Great Society. Johnson used the full powers of the presidency to ensure passage of the Civil Rights Act of 1964 and Voting Rights Act of 1965. These actions helped Johnson to win a historic landslide in the 1964 presidential election over conservative champion Senator Barry Goldwater. Johnson's big victory brought an overwhelming liberal majority in Congress.

== See also ==
- History of the United States (1964–1980)
- Post–World War II boom
- Presidency of Franklin D. Roosevelt
- Timeline of the history of the United States (1930–1949)
- Timeline of the history of the United States (1950–1969)
- United States in the 1950s
