= Ronald Edsforth =

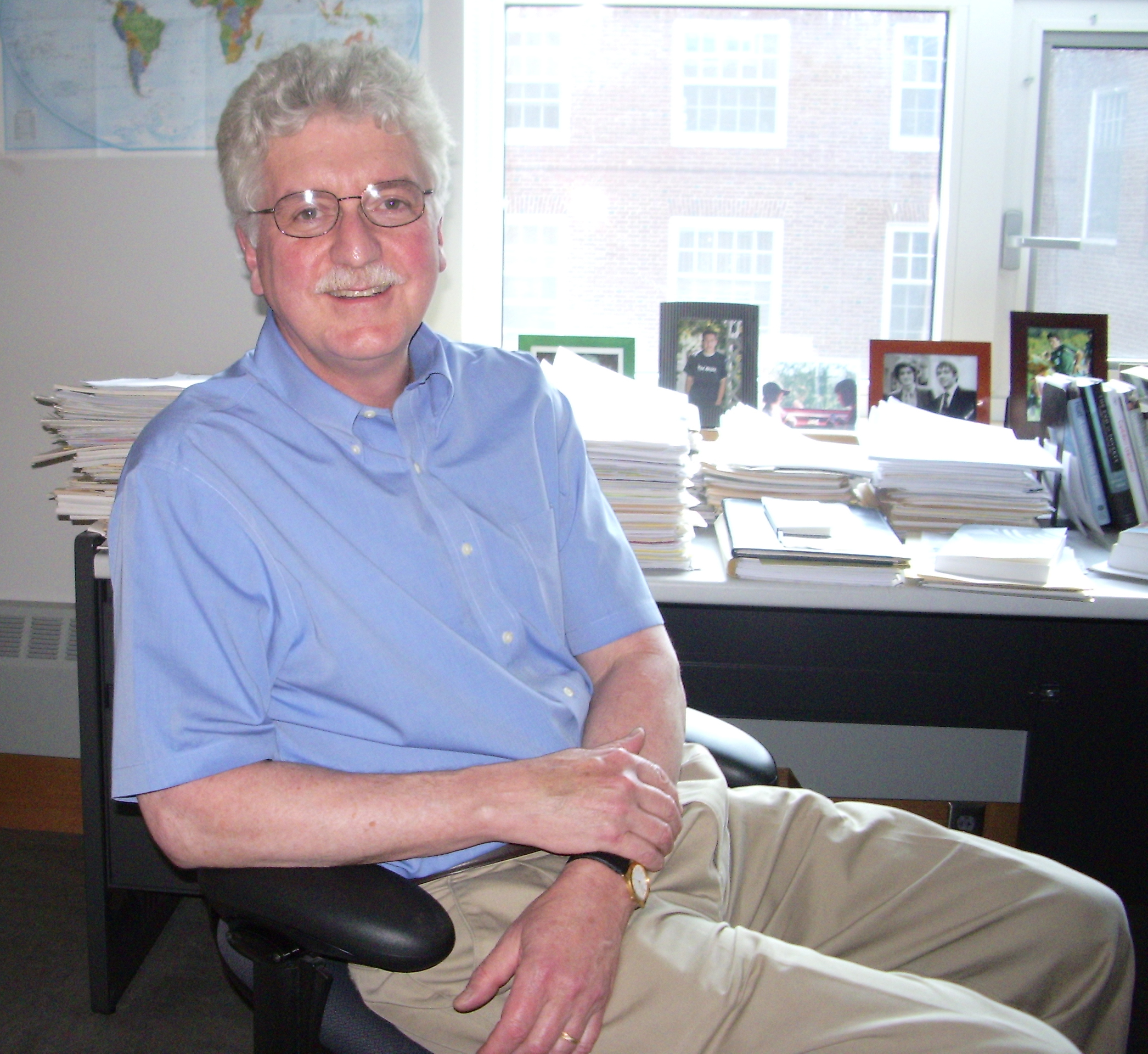
Ronald Edsforth

Ronald Edsforth is a visiting professor of history, and chair of globalization studies in the MALS Department at Dartmouth College.

Edsforth has published several books, including The New Deal: America's Response to the Great Depression. He has also acted a consultant for the PBS documentary, America on Wheels.

Edsforth has taught courses in globalization studies and in war and peace studies in recent years. He is currently writing a history of the world peace movement. He has been a vocal opponent of the Iraq War.

== Bibliography ==
- Class Conflict and Cultural Consensus: The Making of a Mass Consumer Society in Flint, Michigan (1987) ISBN 0-8135-1105-4
- Popular Culture and Political Change in Modern America (1991) ISBN 0-7914-0766-7
- Autowork (1995) ISBN 0-7914-2410-3
- The New Deal: America's Response to the Great Depression (2000) ISBN 1-57718-143-3
