= Bibliography of the Korean War =

This is a list of books about the Korean War.

== Campaigns and battles ==
- Appleman, Roy (1992), South to the Naktong, North to the Yalu, Washington, D.C.: Center of Military History, United States Army, ISBN 0-16-035958-9, archived from the original on 2014-02-07
- Appleman, Roy (1987), East of Chosin: Entrapment and Breakout in Korea, 1950, vol. 2, College Station, TX: Texas A and M University Military History Series, ISBN 0-89096-283-9
- Appleman, Roy (1989), Disaster in Korea: The Chinese Confront MacArthur, vol. 11, College Station, TX: Texas A and M University Military History Series, ISBN 978-1-60344-128-5
- Appleman, Roy (1990), Escaping the Trap: The US Army X Corps in Northeast Korea, 1950, vol. 14, College Station, TX: Texas A and M University Military History Series, ISBN 0-89096-395-9
- Appleman, Roy (1990), Ridgway Duels for Korea, vol. 18, College Station, TX: Texas A and M University Military History Series, ISBN 0-89096-432-7
- Hamburger, Kenneth E. (2003), Leadership in the Crucible : The Korean War Battles of Twin Tunnels & Chipyong-ni, College Station, TX: Texas A&M University Press, ISBN 1-58544-232-1
- Hinshaw, Arned Lee (1989), Heartbreak Ridge, New York, NY: Praeger Publishers, ISBN 0-275-93217-6
- Marshall, S.L.A. (1982), The River and the Gauntlet: Defeat of the Eighth Army by the Chinese Communist forces, November, 1950, in the Battle of the Chongchon River, Korea, Des Moines, IA: Time-Life Books, ISBN 0-8094-3845-3
- Rowny, Edward (2013), An American Soldier's Saga of the Korean War, Washington, D.C.: CreateSpace Independent Publishing Platform, ISBN 978-1490352411
- Rowny, Edward (2013), Smokey Joe & the General, Washington, D.C.: CreateSpace Independent Publishing Platform, ISBN 978-1493538423
- Russ, Martin. Breakout: The Chosin Reservoir Campaign, Korea 1950, Penguin, 2000, 464 pages, ISBN 0-14-029259-4
- Salmon, Andrew (2009), To the Last Round: The Epic British Stand on the Imjin River, London, UK: Aurum Press, ISBN 978-1-84513-408-2
- Sloan, Bill (2009). The Darkest Summer: Pusan and Inchon 1950. New York, New York: Simon & Schuster. ISBN 978-1-4165-7174-2.

== Combat studies ==
=== Air combat ===
- Bruning, John R. (2000), Crimson Sky: The Air Battle for Korea, Riverside, NJ: Protomac Books Inc., ISBN 1-57488-841-2
- Hallion, Richard P. The Naval Air War in Korea (1986).
- Werrell, Kenneth P. (2005), Sabres over MiG Alley, Annapolis, MD: Naval Institution Press, ISBN 1-59114-933-9
- Warrell, Kenneth P. "Across the Yalu: Rules of Engagement and the Communist Air Sanctuary during the Korean War." Journal of Military History 72.2 (2008): 451–76. Print.
- Zhang, Xiao Ming (2004), Red Wings Over the Yalu: China, the Soviet Union, and the Air War in Korea, College Station, TX: Texas A&M University Press, ISBN 1-58544-201-1

=== Ground combat ===
- Flanagan, E.M. Jr., Airborne – A Combat History Of American Airborne Forces, The Random House Publishing Group, 2002
- Kindsvatter, Peter S. American Soldiers: Ground Combat in the World Wars, Korea, and Vietnam. U. Press of Kansas, 2003. 472 pp.
- Mahoney, Kevin (2001), Formidable Enemies: The North Korean and Chinese Soldier in the Korean War, Novato, CA: Presidio Press, ISBN 978-0-89141-738-5
- Marshall, S.L.A. (1988), Infantry Operations and Weapon Usage in Korea, London, UK: Greenhill Books, ISBN 0-947898-88-3
- McMichael, Scott R. (1987), "Chapter 2: The Chinese Communist Forces in Korea" (PDF), A Historical Perspective on Light Infantry, Fort Leavenworth, KS: US Army Combined Arms Center, ISSN 0887-235X, archived from the original (PDF) on 2010-11-16 part 2
- The Indian Army: United Nations Peacekeeping Operations. New Delhi: Lancer Publishers. 1997. p. 114. ISBN 9781897829011.
- India Intelligence, Security Activities and Operations Handbook. IBP USA. 2007. p. 130. ISBN 9781433023019.
- Rowny, Edward (2013), An American Soldier's Saga of the Korean War, Washington, D.C.: CreateSpace Independent Publishing Platform, ISBN 978-1490352411
- Rowny, Edward (2013), Smokey Joe & the General, Washington, D.C.: CreateSpace Independent Publishing Platform, ISBN 978-1493538423
- Tucker-Jones, Anthony (2012), Images of War : Armoured Warfare in the Korean War, Barnsley, South Yorkshire, UK: Pen & Sword Books Ltd., ISBN 978-184884-580-0
- US IX Corps (1951), Enemy Tactics, Techniques and Doctrine Korea 1951 (PDF), Fort Leavenworth, KS: US Army Combined Arms Center, archived from the original (PDF) on 2011-07-23

=== Intelligence gathering ===
- Roe, Patrick C. (2000), The Dragon Strikes, Novato, CA: Presidio, ISBN 0-89141-703-6

=== Logistics ===
- Huston, James Alvin (1989), Guns and Butter, Powder and Rice : U.S. Army Logistics in the Korean War, Selinsgrove, PA: Susquehanna University Press, ISBN 0-941664-87-2
- Shrader, Charles R. (1995), Communist Logistics in the Korean War, Westport, CT: Greenwood Press, ISBN 0-313-29509-3

=== Naval combat ===
- Marolda, Edward (2007), The US Navy in the Korean War, Annapolis, MD: Naval Institute Press, ISBN 978-1-59114-487-8

=== Psychological warfare ===
- Pease, Stephen E. (1992), Psywar: Psychological Warfare in Korea, 1950–1953, Harrisburg, PA: Stackpole Books, ISBN 0-8117-2592-8

=== Strategy ===
- Malkasian, Carter (2002), A History of Modern Wars of Attrition, Westport, CT: Praeger Publishers, ISBN 0-275-97379-4
- Ohn, Chang-Il. "The Korean War of 1950–1953: U.S. Joint Chiefs of Staff and U.S. Strategy." Revue Internationale D'histoire Militaire 70 (1988): 211–41. Print.
- Rees, David (1964). Korea: The Limited War. New York: St Martin's. OCLC 1078693.

=== Unit cohesion ===
- George, Alexander L. (1967), The Chinese Communist Army in Action: The War and its Aftermath, New York, NY: Columbia University Press, OCLC 284111

== Cultural impact ==
- West, Philip; Levine, Steven I.; Hiltz, Jackie (1998), America's Wars in Asia: A Cultural Approach to History and Memory, Armonk, New York: M.E. Sharpe, ISBN 0-7656-0237-7
- Zhang, Hong (2002), The Making of Urban Chinese Images of the United States, 1945–1953, Westport, CT: Greenwood Press, ISBN 0-313-31001-7
- Conway-Lanz, Sahr (2006). Collateral Damage: Americans, Noncombatant Immunity, and Atrocity after World War II. New York: Routledge. ISBN 978-0-415-97828-6

== Encyclopedia and reference work ==
- Brune, Lester and Robin Higham, eds., The Korean War: Handbook of the Literature and Research (Greenwood Press, 1994)
- Ecker, Richard E. (2005), Korean Battle Chronology: Unit-by-Unit United States Casualty Figures and Medal of Honor Citations, Jefferson, NC: McFarland, ISBN 0-7864-1980-6
- Edwards, Paul M. The A to Z of the Korean War. The Scarecrow Press, 2005. 307 pp.
- Edwards, Paul M. The Hill Wars of the Korean Conflict : A Dictionary of Hills, Outposts and other Sites of Military Action. McFarland & Co., 2006. 267 pp.
- Edwards, Paul M. The Korean War: a Historical Dictionary. The Scarecrow Press, 2003. 367 pp.
- Edwards, Paul M. Korean War Almanac (2006)
- Hu, Guang Zheng (胡光正); Ma, Shan Ying (马善营) (1987), Chinese People's Volunteer Army Order of Battle (中国人民志愿军序列) (in Chinese), Beijing: Chinese People's Liberation Army Publishing House, OCLC 298945765
- Matray, James I. (ed.) Historical Dictionary of the Korean War. Greenwood Press, 1991. 626 pp.
- Varhola, Michael J. (2000), Fire and Ice: The Korean War, 1950–1953, Cambridge, MA: Da Capo Press, ISBN 978-1-882810-44-4
- Millett, Allan R, "A Reader's Guide To The Korean War" Journal of Military History (1997) Vol. 61 No. 3; p. 583+ full text in JSTOR; free online revised version
- Millett, Allan R. "The Korean War: A 50 Year Critical Historiography," Journal of Strategic Studies 24 (March 2001), pp. 188–224. full text in Ingenta and Ebsco.
- Millett, Allan R. (2007), The Korean War: The Essential Bibliography, Dulles, VA: Potomac Books, ISBN 978-1-57488-976-5
- Sandler, Stanley ed., The Korean War: An Encyclopedia (Garland, 1995).
- Summers, Harry G. Korean War Almanac (1990).

== International Law ==
=== Law of war and international humanitarian law ===
- Conway-Lanz, Sahr (2006). Collateral Damage: Americans, Noncombatant Immunity, and Atrocity after World War II. New York: Routledge. ISBN 978-0-415-97828-6

== Leaders ==
- Chang, Jung; Halliday, Jon (2005). Mao: The Unknown Story. Knopf. ISBN 0-679-42271-4.
- James, D. Clayton The Years of MacArthur: Triumph and Disaster, 1945–1964 (1985), scholarly biography of MacArthur
- James, D. Clayton with Anne Sharp Wells, Refighting the Last War: Command and Crises in Korea, 1950–1953 (1993)
- Leitich, Keith. Shapers of the Great Debate on the Korean War: A Biographical Dictionary (2006) covers Americans only
- Taaffe, Stephen R. (2016). MacArthur's Korean War Generals. Lawrence, Kansas: University Press of Kansas. ISBN 978-0-7006-2221-4.
- Weintraub, Stanley (2001). MacArthur's War: Korea and the Undoing of an American Hero. New York, New York: Touchstone. ISBN 0-7432-0503-0.

== Official history ==
=== British Commonwealth ===
- Farrar-Hockley, Anthony (1990), Official History: The British Part in the Korean War, vol. I, II, London, England: HMSO, ISBN 0-11-630953-9
- McGibbon, Ian (1996), New Zealand and the Korean War. Combat Operations, vol. II, Auckland, New Zealand: Oxford University Press, ISBN 0-19-558343-4
- O'Neil, Robert, Australia in the Korean War 1950–53 (2 vols). Australian War Memorial and the Australian Government Publishing Service, 1981 and 1985.
- Wood, Herbert Fairlie (1966), Official History of the Canadian Army in Korea: Strange Battleground, Ottawa, Canada: Queen's Printer, OCLC 4199207

=== China ===
- Chinese Military Science Academy (2000), History of War to Resist America and Aid Korea (抗美援朝战争史) (in Chinese), vol. I, II, III, Beijing: Chinese Military Science Academy Publishing House, ISBN 7-80137-390-1.

=== India ===
- Prasad, Sri Nandan (1976). Chakravorty, B. (ed.). History of the Custodian Force (India) in Korea, 1953-54. New Delhi: Historical Section, Ministry of Defence, Government of India.

=== North Korea ===
- DPRK Science Academy History Research Division (1961), History of the Korean People's Just Fatherland Liberation War (朝鲜人民正义的祖国解放战争史) (in Chinese), Pyongyang: DPRK Foreign Language Publishing House.

=== South Korea ===
- Chae, Han Kook; Chung, Suk Kyun; Yang, Yong Cho (2001), Yang, Hee Wan; Lim, Won Hyok; Sims, Thomas Lee; Sims, Laura Marie; Kim, Chong Gu; Millett, Allan R. (eds.), The Korean War, vol. I, II, III, Lincoln, NE: University of Nebraska Press, ISBN 978-0-8032-7795-3.

=== United States ===
- Appleman, Roy (1992), South to the Naktong, North to the Yalu, Washington, D.C.: Center of Military History, United States Army, ISBN 0-16-035958-9, archived from the original on 2014-02-07.
- Field Jr., James A. History of United States Naval Operations: Korea, University Press of the Pacific, 2001, ISBN 0-89875-675-8. official US Navy history.
- Futrell, Robert F. The United States Air Force in Korea, 1950–1953, rev. ed. (Office of the Chief of Air Force History, 1983), official US Air Force history.
- Hermes, Walter G. (1992), Truce Tent and Fighting Front, Washington, DC: Center of Military History, United States Army, ISBN 0-16-035957-0, archived from the original on 2009-02-24.
- Montross, Lynn et al., History of US Marine Operations in Korea, 1950–1953, 5 vols. (Washington: Historical Branch, G-3, Headquarters, Marine Corps, 1954–72).
- Mossman, Billy C. (1990), Ebb and Flow: November 1950–July 1951, United States Army in the Korean War, Washington, D.C.: Center of Military History, United States Army, ISBN 978-1-4102-2470-5, archived from the original on 2021-01-29.
- Schnabel, James F. (1992), Policy and Direction: The First Year., U.S. Army in the Korean War, Washington, D.C.: Center of Military History, U. S. Army, ISBN 0-16-035955-4, archived from the original on 2011-05-17.

== Oral history, recollections and memoirs ==
- Bin Yu and Xiaobing Li, eds. Mao's Generals Remember Korea, University Press of Kansas, 2001, hardcover 328 pp. ISBN 0-7006-1095-2
- Clark, Mark Wayne (1954), From the Danube to the Yalu, New York, NY: Harper, OCLC 178967
- Bowers, William T. (2008), The Line: Combat in Korea, January–February 1951, Lexington, KY: University Press of Kentucky, ISBN 978-0-8131-2508-4
- Bowers, William T. (2010), Striking Back: Combat in Korea, March–April 1951, Lexington, KY: University Press of Kentucky, ISBN 978-0-8131-2564-0
- Matthew B. Ridgway, The Korean War (1967)
- Millett, Allan R. Their War for Korea: American, Asian, and European Combatants and Civilians, 1945–1953. Brassey's, 2003. 310 pp.
- Toland, John. In Mortal Combat: Korea, 1950–1953 (1991)
- Paik, Sun Yup (1992), From Pusan to Panmunjom, Riverside, NJ: Brassey Inc, ISBN 0-02-881002-3
- Spurr, Russell (1988), Enter the Dragon: China's Undeclared War Against the U.S. in Korea 1950–51, New York, NY: Newmarket Press, ISBN 1-55704-008-7
- Rowny, Edward (2013), An American Soldier's Saga of the Korean War, Washington, D.C.: CreateSpace, ISBN 978-1490352411
- Rowny, Edward (2013), Smokey Joe & the General, Washington, D.C.: CreateSpace, ISBN 978-1493538423
- Watson, Brent Byron. Far Eastern Tour: The Canadian Infantry in Korea, 1950–1953. 2002. 256 pp.
- Wu, Ru Lin (吴瑞林) (1995), 42nd Corps During the War to Resist America and Aid Korea (抗美援朝中的第42军) (in Chinese), Beijing: Gold Wall Press, ISBN 7-80084-118-9
- Yoo, Young-Bok (2012), Tears of Blood: A Korean POW's Fight for Freedom, Family and Justice, Los Angeles, CA: Korean War POW Affairs, ISBN 978-1479383856

== Origins, politics, diplomacy ==
- Barnouin, Barbara; Yu, Changgeng (2006). Zhou Enlai: A Political Life. Hong Kong: Chinese University Press. ISBN 962-996-280-2.
- Becker, Jasper (2005). Rogue Regime: Kim Jong Il and the Looming Threat of North Korea. New York: Oxford University Press. ISBN 0-19-517044-X.
- Carpenter, William M. "The Korean War: A Strategic Perspective Thirty Years Later." Comparative Strategy 2.4 (1980): 335–53. Print
- Casey, Steven. Selling the Korean War: Propaganda, Politics, and Public Opinion in the United States, 1950–1953. Oxford: Oxford UP, 2008. Print.
- Chen, Jian (1994). China's Road to the Korean War: The Making of the Sino-American Confrontation. New York: Columbia University Press. ISBN 978-0-231-10025-0.
- Cumings, Bruce (1981). "3, 4". Origins of the Korean War. Princeton University Press. ISBN 89-7696-612-0.
- Cumings, Bruce (1997). Korea's Place in the Sun: A Modern History. WW Norton & Company. ISBN 0-393-31681-5.
- Foot, Rosemary, "Making Known the Unknown War: Policy Analysis of the Korean Conflict in the Last Decade," Diplomatic History 15 (Summer 1991): 411–31, in JSOR.
- Foot, Rosemary. The Wrong War: American Policy and the Dimensions of the Korean Conflict, 1950–1953. Ithaca: Cornell UP, 1985. Print.
- Foot, Rosemary (1990), A Substitute for Victory: The Politics of Peacemaking at the Korean Armistice Talks, Ithaca, NY: Cornell University Press, ISBN 0-8014-2413-5.
- Goncharov, Sergei N., John W. Lewis; and Xue Litai, Uncertain Partners: Stalin, Mao, and the Korean War, Stanford University Press, 1993, ISBN 0-8047-2521-7, diplomatic.
- Kaufman, Burton I. The Korean War: Challenges in Crisis, Credibility, and Command. Temple University Press, 1986, focus is on Washington.
- Kaufman, Burton I. The Korean Conflict (Greenwood Press, 1999).
- Kim, Yǒng-jin (1973). Major Powers and Korea. Silver Spring, MD: Research Institute on Korean Affairs. OCLC 251811671.
- Matray, James. "Truman's Plan for Victory: National Self Determination and the Thirty-Eighth Parallel Decision in Korea," Journal of American History 66 (September, 1979), 314–33. in JSTOR.
- Millett, Allan R. The War for Korea, 1945–1950: A House Burning vol 1 (2005) ISBN 0-7006-1393-5, origins.
- Oliver, Robert T. Why War Came in Korea. New York: Fordham UP, 1950. Print.
- Pembroke, Michael (2018). Korea: Where the American Century Began. London, England: Oneworld Publications. ISBN 978-1-78607-473-7
- Spanier, John W. The Truman-MacArthur Controversy and the Korean War (1959).
- Stueck, William. Rethinking the Korean War: A New Diplomatic and Strategic History. Princeton U. Press, 2002. 285 pp.
- Stueck, Jr., William J. The Korean War: An International History (Princeton University Press, 1995), diplomatic
- Zhang, Shu Guang (1992), Deterrence and Strategic Culture: Chinese-American Confrontations, 1949–1958, Ithaca, NY: Cornell University Press, ISBN 0-8014-2751-7
- Misra, Biswamohan (1964). "The Indian U.N. Policy during the Korean Crisis". The Indian Journal of Political Science. 25 (3/4): 145–151. ISSN 0019-5510. JSTOR 41854025.
- Barnes, Robert (2013). "Between the Blocs: India, the United Nations, and Ending the Korean War". The Journal of Korean Studies. 18 (2): 263–286. doi:10.1353/jks.2013.0022. ISSN 0731-1613. JSTOR 44080505. S2CID 143769689.

== Overview ==
=== General ===
- Blair, Clay (1987), The Forgotten War, New York, NY: Times Books, ISBN 0-8129-1670-0
- Conway-Lanz, Sahr (2006). Collateral Damage: Americans, Noncombatant Immunity, and Atrocity after World War II. New York: Routledge. ISBN 978-0-415-97828-6
- Cumings, Bruce (2011). The Korean War: A History. New York (N.Y.): Random House Inc. ISBN 978-0-8129-7896-4
- Goulden, Joseph C. (1983). Korea: The Untold Story of the War. New York: McGraw-Hill. p. 17. ISBN 0-07-023580-5.
- Halberstam, David (2007), The Coldest Winter – America and the Korean War, New York, NY: Hyperion, ISBN 978-1-4013-0052-4
- Hanley, Charles J. (2020). Ghost Flames: Life and Death in a Hidden War, Korea 1950-1953. New York, New York: Public Affairs. ISBN 9781541768154.
- Hanley, Charles J.; Choe, Sang-Hun; Mendoza, Martha (2001). The Bridge at No Gun Ri: A Hidden Nightmare from the Korean War. New York: Henry Holt and Company. ISBN 0-8050-6658-6.
- Hastings, Max (1987). The Korean War. New York, New York: Simon & Schuster. ISBN 0671528238. British perspective.
- Halliday, Jon; Cumings, Bruce (1988). Korea: The Unknown War. London, England: Viking. ISBN 0-670-81903-4.
- Hickey, Michael, The Korean War: The West Confronts Communism, 1950–1953 (London: John Murray, 1999) ISBN 0-7195-5559-0 ISBN 9780719555596.
- Hwang, Su-kyoung (2016). Korea's Grievous War. Philadelphia: University of Pennsylvania Press. ISBN 9780812248456.
- MacDonald, Callum A. (1986). Korea: The War Before Vietnam. New York: Free Press. ISBN 0-02-919621-3.
- Malkasian, Carter (2001). The Korean War, 1950–1953. Essential Histories. London; Chicago: Fitzroy Dearborn. ISBN 1-57958-364-4.
- Millett, Allan R. (2010), The War for Korea, 1950–1951: They Came From the North, Lawrence, KS: University Press of Kansas, ISBN 978-0-7006-1709-8
- O'Ballance, Edgar. Korea: 1950–1953. Hamden: Archon, 1969. Print.
- Pembroke, Michael (2018). Korea: Where the American Century Began. London, England: Oneworld Publications. ISBN 978-1-78607-473-7
- Shaara, Jeff (2017), The Frozen Hours: A Novel of the Korean War. New York: Ballantine Books. ISBN 9780345549228
- Stein, R. Conrad (1994). The Korean War: "The Forgotten War". Hillside, NJ: Enslow Publishers. ISBN 0-89490-526-0.
- Stokesbury, James L (1990). A Short History of the Korean War. New York: Harper Perennial. ISBN 0-688-09513-5.
- Srivastava, Mahavir Prasad (1982). The Korean Conflict: Search for Unification. New Delhi: Prentice Hall of India. ISBN 9780876922170.

=== British Commonwealth ===
- Bercuson, David J. (1999), Blood on the Hills: the Canadian Army in the Korean War, Toronto, ON: University of Toronto Press, ISBN 0-8020-0980-8
- Johnston, William (2003), A War of Patrols: Canadian Army Operations in Korea, Vancouver: UBC Press, ISBN 0-7748-1008-4

=== Belgium ===
- Crahay, Albert (1985), The Brown Berets in Korea 1950–1953 (Béréts Bruns en Corée 1950–53) (in French), Brussels: Editions J.M. Collet
- (in French and Dutch) Crahay, Albert, The Belgians in Korea (Les Belges en Corée / De Belgen in Korea).
- (in French and Dutch) Verhaegen, Benoît (1999), A Season in Korea: From the "Kamina" to the Imjin (Une Saison en Corée: Du " Kamina " à Imjin / Operatie in Korea: Van 'Kamina' naar Imjin), Brussels: Editions Racine, ISBN 2-87386-164-9
- (in French and Dutch) Tobback, André, In Korea 1952–1953: At the front with 2 platoon, B company (En Corée: 1952-53 – Au front avec la 2ème peloton de la compagnie B / In Korea 1952–1953 – Aan het front met het 2de peloton va, de compagnie B).
- de Wit, Franz (2003), Belgians Can Do Too! Korea 15 July 1951 – 15 July 1952 (in Dutch), Brussels: De Krijger.
- Pontzeele, Didier (2004), Goodnight Irene: The Korean War diary of Marcel Fichefet (Goodnight Irene: Het Koreaans oorlogsdagboek van Marcel Fichefet) (in Dutch), Brussels: De Krijger.
- (in French and Dutch) Peerlinck, Hugo, Chronicle of the Belgian Battalion in Korea 1950–1955 (Chronique du Bataillon Belge Corée 1950–55 / Kroniek Van Het Belgisch Koreabataljon 1950–1955), Brussels: Editions Flyingpencil.
- Peerlinck, Hugo, Album of the Belgian Battalion in Korea 1950–1955 (Album van het Belgisch Koreabataljon 1950–1955) (in Dutch), Brussels: Editions Flyingpencil.
- Gahide, Jean-Pierre (1991). Belgium and the Korean War: 1950–1955 (La Belgique et la guerre de Corée: 1950-1955) (in French). Brussels: Koninklijk Legermuseum. ISBN 9782870510100.

=== China ===
- Xue, Yan (徐焰) (1990), First Confrontation: Reviews and Reflections on the History of War to Resist America and Aid Korea (第一次较量：抗美援朝战争的历史回顾与反思) (in Chinese), Beijing: Chinese Radio and Television Publishing House, ISBN 7-5043-0542-1
- Zhang, Shu Guang (1995), Mao's Military Romanticism: China and the Korean War, 1950–1953, Lawrence, KS: University Press of Kansas, ISBN 0-7006-0723-4

=== Ethiopia ===
- Skordiles, Komon, Kagnew, the story of the Ethiopian fighters in Korea, 1954.

=== India ===
- Paul, A. K. (1953). India and the Commonwealth in the Korean War. Institute of Commonwealth Studies, University of London.
- Heimsath, Charles Herman (1956). India's role in the Korean war.
- Gatlin, Douglas Stuart (1956). Indian National Interest and the Korean War: A Case Study. Gainesville: University of Florida.
- Dayal, Shiv (1959). India's Role in the Korean Question: A Study in the Settlement of International Disputes Under the United Nations. New Delhi: S. Chand.
- Misra, Biswamohan (1964). "The Indian U.N. Policy during the Korean Crisis". The Indian Journal of Political Science. 25 (3/4): 145–151. ISSN 0019-5510. JSTOR 41854025.
- Kaushik, Ram Pal (1972). The Crucial Years of Non-alignment: USA, Korean War, India. Kumar Bros. ISBN 9780896845442.
- Prasad, Sri Nandan (1976). Chakravorty, B. (ed.). History of the Custodian Force (India) in Korea, 1953-54. New Delhi: Historical Section, Ministry of Defence, Government of India.
- Kim, Kyoung-soo (1983). The Genesis of Non-alignment: A Study of India's Foreign Policy with Special Reference to the Korean War (1950-53). State University of New York at Albany.
- Hull, Victoria Dryden (1984). Indo-American Relations During the Korean War. University Microfilms.
- The Indian Army: United Nations Peacekeeping Operations. New Delhi: Lancer Publishers. 1997. p. 114. ISBN 9781897829011.
- India Intelligence, Security Activities and Operations Handbook. IBP USA. 2007. p. 130. ISBN 9781433023019.
- China: the Korean War; Relations with India, the United States and the United Nations, Internal Developments, September 1950. Adam Matthew Digital. 2011.
- Barnes, Robert (2013). "Between the Blocs: India, the United Nations, and Ending the Korean War". The Journal of Korean Studies. 18 (2): 263–286. doi:10.1353/jks.2013.0022. ISSN 0731-1613. JSTOR 44080505. S2CID 143769689.

=== United States ===
- Alexander, Bevin R. (1986), Korea: The First War We Lost, New York, NY: Hippocrene Books, Inc, ISBN 978-0-87052-135-5
- Conway-Lanz, Sahr (2006). Collateral Damage: Americans, Noncombatant Immunity, and Atrocity after World War II. New York: Routledge. ISBN 978-0-415-97828-6
- Cumings, Bruce (2011). The Korean War: A History. New York (N.Y.): Random House Inc. ISBN 978-0-8129-7896-4
- Fehrenbach, T.R. (2001), This Kind of War: The Classic Korean War History – Fiftieth Anniversary Edition, Potomac Books Inc., ISBN 978-1-57488-334-3
- Halberstam, David (2007), The Coldest Winter: America and the Korean War, New York, NY: Hyperion Books, ISBN 978-1401300524
- Hanley, Charles J.; Choe, Sang-Hun; Mendoza, Martha (2001). The Bridge at No Gun Ri: A Hidden Nightmare from the Korean War. New York: Henry Holt and Company. ISBN 0-8050-6658-6.
- Pembroke, Michael (2018). Korea: Where the American Century Began. London, England: Oneworld Publications. ISBN 978-1-78607-473-7

=== Turkey ===
- Gunacgun, Ilker (2011), Sakin Sabahlar Ülkesi [Land of the Morning Calm], Istanbul, Turkey: Sokak Kitapları Yayınları, ISBN 9789944205429

== Prisoners of war ==
- Bassett, Richard M. And the Wind Blew Cold: The Story of an American POW in North Korea. Kent State U. Press, 2002. 117 pp.
- Biderman, Albert D. (1963), March to Calumny: The Story of American POW's in Korea, New York, NY: The Macmillan Company, OCLC 4956442
- Carlson, Lewis H. (2002). Remembered Prisoners of a Forgotten War: An Oral History of Korean War POWs. St Martin's Press. ISBN 0-312-28684-8.
- Cunningham, Cyril (2000), No Mercy, No Leniency: Communist Mistreatment of British Prisoners of War in Korea, Barnsley, South Yorkshire: Leo Cooper, ISBN 0-85052-767-8
- Heo, Man-ho (2002). "North Korea's Continued Detention of South Korean POWs since the Korean and Vietnam Wars" (PDF). Korea Journal of Defense Analysis. XIV No. 2: 141–65. Archived from the original (PDF) on 2016-01-28.
- Kinkhead, Eugene (1981), In Every War But One, Westport, CT: Greenwood Press, ISBN 0-313-23113-3
- Lech, Raymond B. (2000), Broken Soldiers, Chicago, IL: University of Illinois, ISBN 0-252-02541-5
- Young, Charles S. (2014), Name, Rank, and Serial Number: Exploiting Korean War POWs at Home and Abroad, New York: Oxford, ISBN 978-0-19-518348-1
- Yoo, Young-Bok (2012), Tears of Blood: A Korean POW's Fight for Freedom, Family and Justice, Los Angeles, CA: Korean War POW Affairs, ISBN 978-1479383856

== Unit history ==
- Bowers, William T.; Hammong, William M.; MacGarrigle, George L. (2005), Black Soldier, White Army: The 24th Infantry Regiment in Korea, Honolulu, Hawaii: University Press of the Pacific, ISBN 978-1-4102-2467-5
- Hayhurst, Fred (2001), Green Berets in Korea: The Story of 41 Independent Commando – Royal Marines, New York, NY: Vanguard Press, ISBN 1-903489-12-1
- Guo, Bao Heng (郭宝恒); Hu, Zhi Yuan (胡支援) (1996), Gallop Across the Han River: 42nd Corps in Korea (驰骋汉江南北 : 四十二军在朝鲜) (in Chinese), Shenyang, China: Liaoning People's Publishing House, ISBN 7-205-03506-6
- Jiang, Yong Hui (江拥輝) (1989), 38th Corps in Korea (三十八军在朝鲜) (in Chinese), Shenyang, China: Liaoning People's Publishing House, ISBN 7-205-00630-9
- Villahermosa, Gilberto N. (2009), Honor and Fidelity: The 65th Infantry in Korea, 1950-1953, Washington, D.C.: United States Army Center of Military History, archived from the original on 2010-11-08
- Wu, Xin Quan (吳信泉); Wang, Zhao Yun (王照运) (1996), 1000 Days on the Korean Battlefield: 39th Corps in Korea (朝鲜战场1000天 ： 三十九军在朝鲜) (in Chinese), Shenyang, China: Liaoning People's Publishing House, ISBN 7-205-03504-X
- Rivera, Gilberto (2015), Cuando El Rio de Corozal Cruzaba el Paralelo 38: Prohibido Olvidar El Regimiento 65 de Infanteria (in Spanish), Corozal, PR: CreateSpace Independent Publishing Platform, ISBN 978-1544638928
- Prasad, Sri Nandan (1976). Chakravorty, B. (ed.). History of the Custodian Force (India) in Korea, 1953-54. New Delhi: Historical Section, Ministry of Defence, Government of India.
