= Korea's Grievous War =

2016 non-fiction book

- Author: Su-kyoung Hwang
- Publisher: University of Pennsylvania Press
- Publication date: 2016
- Pages: 250
- ISBN: 9780812293111
- OCLC: 953602331

Korea's Grievous War is a non-fiction book about the Korean War by Su-kyoung Hwang. It was published in 2016 by the University of Pennsylvania Press.

== Author ==
Su-kyoung Hwang is an historian specialising in Korean studies. As of 2024, she is a senior lecturer of Korean studies at The University of Sydney.

== Content ==
Korea's Grievous War' discusses the civilian casualties of the Korean War. In focuses on civilians killed by anti-communist forces, especially those killed by American-forces or American-backed forces. Hwang argues that those killed by anti-communist forces, such as the civilians killed during the Jeju uprising and Bodo League massacre, became "ungrievable" in modern South Korea, and that the general public, like the government, prefers to mourn civilians and soldiers killed by the communist forces. In particular, the book deals with the yŏnjwaje system, where the descendants and family members of communists and Korean civilians killed during the Korean War were treated as perpetrators and pro-communist during the 1960s and 1970s, when South Korea was under the dictatorship of Park Chung Hee.

== Reception ==
Charles J. Hanley, a journalist who won a Pulitzer Prize for his work in uncovering the No Gun Ri massacre, praised Korea's Grievious War, especially compared to other books about the subject such as The Coldest Winter. His review mostly focuses on Hwang's research, which was made difficult the lack of records, by archivists resistant to showing her negative information about the actions of the United States government, and by survivors of massacres who were unwilling to relive their trauma. He notes her interviews with survivors and her documentation of United States involvement or acknowledgement in several massacres, the bombing of refugee columns, and the bombing of a South Korean refugee encampment by the United States Navy. Allan R. Millett, historian and former colonel of the Marine Corps Reserve, was much more critical. He questioned Hwang's methodology in counting the number of victims, the way the book does not discuss atrocities committed by the North Koreans, and her use of the survivor's testimony to describe the events. He also argues that, even if the civilian deaths were as high as Hwang stated, stating that they were actually caused by "malnutrition, starvation, hypothermia, accidents, and epidemic diseases". He then goes on to say that Hwang does not provide enough credit to US military forces for documenting, and eventually pressuring the South Korean government to stop, the massacres.

Reviewers such as Richard Trembath, in Asian Studies Review, also praised her research. Nan Kim, in a Journal of Korean Studies review, spoke positively about Hwang's research and analysis of the conflict. Trembath and Kim were both critical of the fifth chapter initially, but came to different conclusions about it. According to Trembath, when first reading the chapter, found that the claims it made about the United States' role in influencing the modern North Korean government were "overstated" and "did not sit comfortably with the rest of the book". However, after reading the United States' use of napalm, and the survivor's testimony about its effect, he re-evaluated his opinion. Kim did not, and described the fourth and fifth chapters as weaker than the rest of the book. Kim is also critical of Hwang's choice, however, to accept the traditional explanation that North Korea invading South Korea was the main catalyst for the Korean War, and implies that she fell victim to the "Cold War bias" that Hwang was so wary of during the rest of the book. In particular, Kim highlights both the "post-colonial struggle" which existed between Syngman Rhee and Kim Il Sung after the dissolution of the Empire of Japan, and the United States' support for Japan as a force against the newly-communist People's Republic of China as contributing factors, Kim argues that Hwang's lack of commentary on those issues provides a "narrow characterization", but nonetheless describes Korea's Grievous War as "an impressive and valuable book" and praises her treatment of war trauma. Mark Caprio, in The Journal of Asian Studies, however, described it as an "important supplementary text" for studies on genocide, and, unlike Kim, spoke positively about the way Hwang connected the Korean War to the end of World War II. Instead, he was critical of the book's editing and the way it, in his view, negatively impacted the narrative.

Kyung Moon Hwang, in The American Historical Review, took a different approach. While he described the book as a "sterling example of historical anthropology" and notes the effort which Su-kyoung Hwang put into researching it, he counters that with his claim that her findings have been public knowledge in amongst the South Korean public and academic circles for some period of time. However, he praises her interviews with the survivors of massacres and their descendants, describing them as "strikingly new".

== Bibliography ==
- Hwang, Su-kyoung (2016). Korea's Grievous War. University of Pennsylvania Press. ISBN 978-0-8122-9311-1.
