= The Reckoning (Halberstam book) =

1986 non-fiction book by David Halberstam

- Author: David Halberstam
- Language: English
- Subject: Automotive industry
- Publisher: William Morrow and Company
- Publication date: 1986
- Media type: Print (hardcover and paperback)
- Pages: 752
- ISBN: 978-0688048389

The Reckoning is a non-fiction book about the automotive industry written by David Halberstam and published in 1986. He spent five years researching and writing it.

It is the third and final book of his trilogy study of the forces of power in America, after The Best and the Brightest and The Powers That Be, and has been described as "a parallel history and study of the American and Japanese automobile industries, using Nissan and Ford Motors as examples".
