= Frye Gaillard =

American historian and author (born 1946)

- Born: December 23, 1946; Mobile, Alabama, U.S.
- Education: Vanderbilt University (BA)
- Occupations: Journalist, historian, writer
- Spouse(s): Rosemary Peduzzi (divorced 1981) Nancy Thomas (m. 1988)
- Children: 2

Frye Gaillard (born December 23, 1946) is an American historian and author.

== Early life and education ==
Frye Gaillard was born in Mobile, Alabama, on December 23, 1946. His parents were lawyer and later judge Walter Frye Gaillard Sr., and Helen Amante Gaillard. Gaillard attended Vanderbilt University, graduating in 1968. During the 1960s Gaillard came into proximity with many of the most prominent political personalities of the decade. As a high school student in 1963, Gaillard witnessed the arrest of Martin Luther King Jr. in Birmingham, Alabama, during King's Birmingham campaign against racial segregation. While at Vanderbilt he came into contact with Stokley Carmichael and Eldridge Cleaver, when the two Black Panthers were engaged to speak. Shortly after, in 1968, he invited Robert F. Kennedy to speak at Vanderbilt, 11 weeks prior to Kennedy's assassination.

== Career ==
Gaillard started his career at the Race Relations Reporter in Nashville as managing editor from 1970 to 1972, then moved to the Charlotte Observer as a writer, editor and columnist, while teaching nonfiction writing at Queens College, both until 1990. While with the Observer he won awards from the North Carolina Press Association for spot news, features and investigative reporting. In 2004 he moved back to Mobile. As an author he won the 1989 Gustavus Myers Award for The Dream Long Deferred, and in 2007 the Alabama Library Association Book of the Year for Cradle of Freedom.

Gaillard's 2018 book A Hard Rain was inspired by David Halberstam's The Fifties, and documents the 1960s in part through Gaillard's experiences of the time. Gailllard has been author-in-residence at the University of South Alabama since 2007. He has written more than 25 books.

== Published works ==
- Race, Rock and Religion: Profiles from a Southern Journalist, 1982
- The Catawba River, with Dot Jackson, 1983
- Becoming Truly Free: 300 Years of Black History in the Carolinas, with Richard Maschal and others, 1985
- The Unfinished Presidency: Essays on Jimmy Carter, 1986
- The Dream Long Deferred: The Landmark Struggle for Desegregation in Charlotte, North Carolina, 1988
- Watermelon Wine: The Spirit of Country Music, 1989
- The Secret Diary of Mikhail Gorbachev, 1990
- Southern Voices: Profiles and Other Stories, 1991
- Kyle at 200 M.P.H.: A Sizzling Season in the Petty/NASCAR Dynasty, with Kyle Petty, 1993
- Lessons from the Big House: One Family's Passage through the History of the South, with Nancy Gaillard, 1994
- The Way We See It: Documentary Photography by the Children of Charlotte, with Rachel Gaillard, 1995
- The 521 All-Stars, with Bryon Baldwin, 1999
- If I Were A Carpenter: Twenty Years of Habitat for Humanity, 1996
- The Heart of Dixie: Southern Rebels, Renegades and Heroes, 1996
- Carmel Country Club: The First 50 Years, 1997
- Voices from the Attic, 1997
- As Long as the Waters Flow: Native Americans in the South and East, with Carolyn Demerit and others, 1998
- Mobile and the Eastern Shore, with Nancy Gaillard, 2003
- Charlotte's Holy Wars: Religion in a New South City, 2005
- Cradle of Freedom: Alabama and the Movement that Changed America, 2006
- Prophet from Plains: Jimmy Carter and His Legacy, 2007
- In the Path of Storms: Bayou la Batre, Coden and the Alabama Coast, with Sheila Hagler and others, 2008
- With Music and Justice for All" Some Southerners and Their Passions, 2008
- Alabama's Civil Rights Trail: An Illustrated Guide to the Cradle of Freedom, 2010
- The Books that Mattered: A Reader's Memoir, 2012
- The Quilt: And the Poetry of Alabama Music, with Kathryn Scheldt, 2015
- Journey to the Wilderness: War, Memory, and a Southern Family's Civil War Letters, with Steven Trout, 2015
- Go South to Freedom, with Anne Kent Rush, 2016
- A Hard Rain: America in the 1960s, Our Decade of Hope, Possibility, and Innocence Lost, 2018
- The Slave Who Went to Congress, with Marti Rosner and others, 2020
