= Bibliography of the early People's Republic of China =

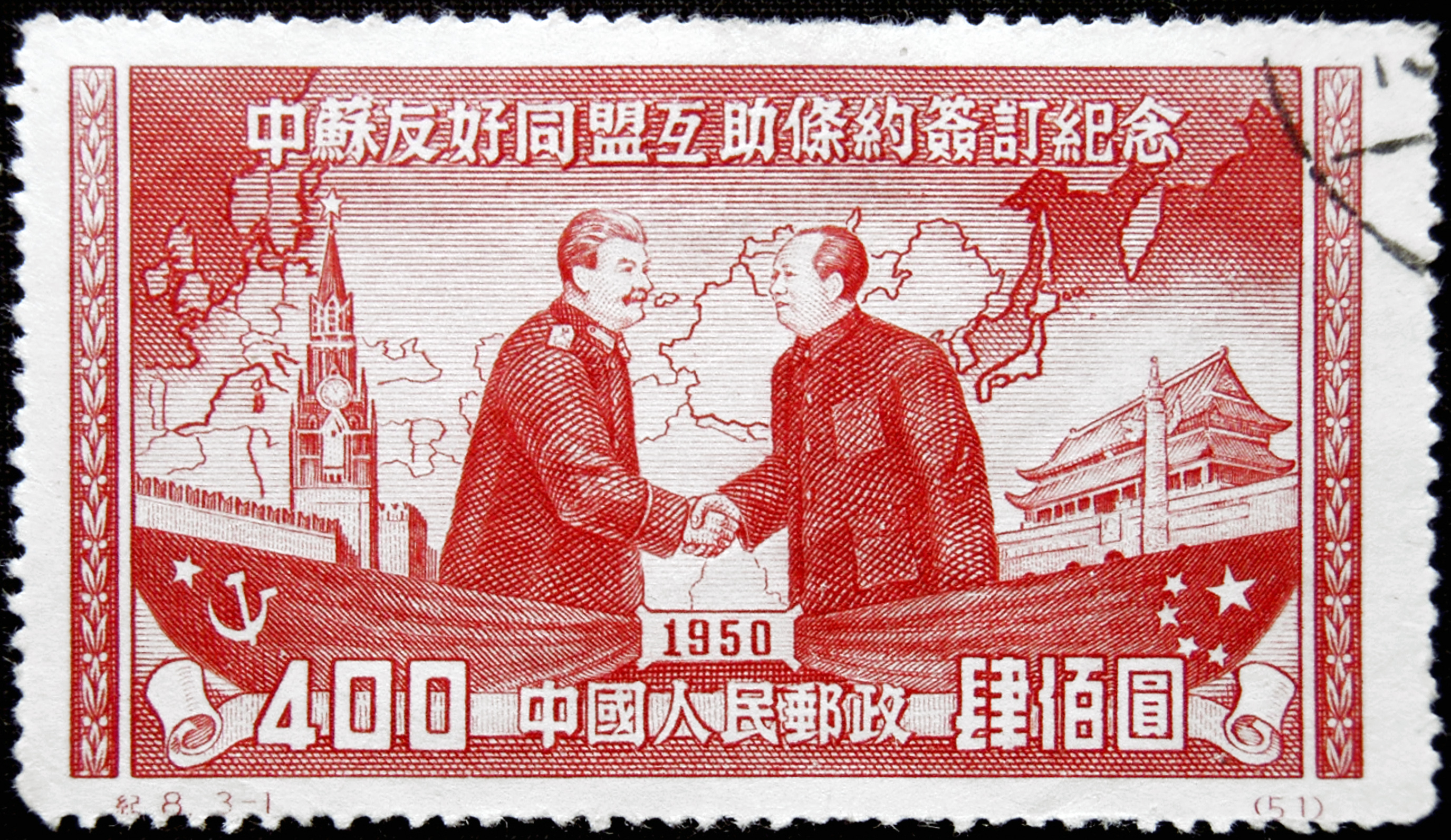
- Subject: History of the People's Republic of China (1949–1976)
- Scope: Books, journal articles, primary sources
- Period covered: 1949 – 1957
- Languages: English
- Related: Bibliography of Chinese history; Bibliography of the Cold War; Bibliography of the Korean War

Bibliography of the early People's Republic of China is a list of English-language books and scholarly articles on the history of the People's Republic of China from its founding in 1949 to 1957.

This bibliography contains academic-level English-language books (including translations) and journal articles, published mainly after World War II. (Note: Works published before World War II should be limited to areas where there are no significant post–World War II books on the subject, or where the work in question has significant historical merit.) Book entries may have references to reviews published in academic journals or major newspapers when these could be considered helpful. These reference reviews also function as a resource to find other works on this subject.

Works listed here are cited in the notes or bibliographies of scholarly sources. Each is published by an academic or major trade press, written by a recognized expert, or substantially reviewed in scholarly journals; borderline cases are omitted. A selection of primary sources is included. Many of the books below carry their own bibliographies; see Further reading section for longer ones, and External links section for historical sites and museums.

Citations follow APA style. (Note: Entries are in plain text APA 7 format without templates; templates are used only for reviews and notes.) Books have citations to academic journal or mainstream published reviews when available. For books only partly about the subject, relevant chapter or section titles are given where useful and available. Translators of the original-language edition are included when possible. In cases where a title or name has appeared with more than one English spelling, the most recent published form is used and a footnote documents any earlier title under which the work appeared.

== General surveys ==
- Brown, J., & Pickowicz, P. G. (Eds.). (2007). Dilemmas of victory: The early years of the People's Republic of China. Harvard University Press.
- Brown, J., & Johnson, M. D. (Eds.). (2015). Maoism at the grassroots: Everyday life in China's era of high socialism. Harvard University Press.
- Dikötter, F. (2013). The tragedy of liberation: A history of the Chinese Revolution, 1945–1957. Bloomsbury.
- MacFarquhar, R., & Fairbank, J. K. (Eds.). (1987). The Cambridge history of China: Vol. 14. The People's Republic, part 1: The emergence of revolutionary China, 1949–1965. Cambridge University Press.
- Meisner, M. (1977). Mao's China: A history of the People's Republic. Free Press.
- Schurmann, F. (1966). Ideology and organization in Communist China. University of California Press.
- Strauss, J. C. (2019). State formation in China and Taiwan: Bureaucracy, campaign, and performance. Cambridge University Press.
- Walder, A. G. (2015). China under Mao: A revolution derailed. Harvard University Press.

== Domestic policy ==
=== Political ===
- Cheek, T. (1997). Propaganda and culture in Mao's China: Deng Tuo and the intelligentsia. Clarendon Press.
- Gao, J. Z. (2004). The Communist takeover of Hangzhou: The transformation of city and cadre, 1949–1954. University of Hawaii Press.
- Goldman, M. (1967). Literary dissent in Communist China. Harvard University Press.
- Lekner, D. (2018). A chill in spring: Literary exchange and political struggle in the Hundred Flowers and Anti-Rightist campaigns of 1956–1958. Modern China, 45(1), 37–63. doi:10.1177/0097700418783280
- Lieberthal, K. G. (1980). Revolution and tradition in Tientsin, 1949–1952. Stanford University Press.
- MacFarquhar, R. (1960). The Hundred Flowers campaign and the Chinese intellectuals. Praeger.
- MacFarquhar, R. (1974). The origins of the Cultural Revolution: Vol. 1. Contradictions among the people, 1956–1957. Columbia University Press.
- Mu, F.-S. (1963). The wilting of the Hundred Flowers: The Chinese intelligentsia under Mao. Praeger.
- Schoenhals, M. (1986). Original contradictions: On the unrevised text of Mao Zedong's "On the correct handling of contradictions among the people". The Australian Journal of Chinese Affairs, 16, 99–112. JSTOR 2158777
- Solinger, D. J. (1977). Regional government and political integration in southwest China, 1949–1954: A case study. University of California Press.
- Teiwes, F. C. (1979). Politics and purges in China: Rectification and the decline of party norms, 1950–1965. M. E. Sharpe.
- Teiwes, F. C. (1990). Politics at Mao's court: Gao Gang and party factionalism in the early 1950s. M. E. Sharpe.
- Vogel, E. F. (1969). Canton under communism: Programs and politics in a provincial capital, 1949–1968. Harvard University Press.

=== Terror and abuse ===
- Chen, T. H. E. (1960). Thought reform of the Chinese intellectuals. Hong Kong University Press.
- Cohen, J. A. (1968). The criminal process in the People's Republic of China, 1949–1963: An introduction. Harvard University Press.
- Lieberthal, K. (1973). The suppression of secret societies in post-liberation Tientsin. The China Quarterly, 54, 242–266. doi:10.1017/s0305741000015484
- Lifton, R. J. (1961). Thought reform and the psychology of totalism: A study of "brainwashing" in China. W. W. Norton.
- Smith, A. M. (2013). Thought reform and China's dangerous classes: Reeducation, resistance, and the people. Rowman & Littlefield.
- Smith, A. M. (2013). Thought reform and the unreformable: Reeducation centers and the rhetoric of opposition in the early People's Republic of China. The Journal of Asian Studies, 72(4), 937–958. doi:10.1017/s0021911813001654
- Strauss, J. C. (2002). Paternalist terror: The campaign to suppress counterrevolutionaries and regime consolidation in the People's Republic of China, 1950–1953. Comparative Studies in Society and History, 44(1), 80–105. doi:10.1017/s001041750200004x
- Strauss, J. C. (2006). Morality, coercion and state building by campaign in the early PRC: Regime consolidation and after, 1949–1956. The China Quarterly, 188, 891–912. doi:10.1017/s0305741006000488
- Yang, K. (2008). Reconsidering the campaign to suppress counterrevolutionaries. The China Quarterly, 193, 102–121. doi:10.1017/s0305741008000064

==== Prisons and labour camps ====
- Bao, R.-W., & Chelminski, R. (1973). Prisoner of Mao. Coward, McCann & Geoghegan.
- Mühlhahn, K. (2009). Criminal justice in China: A history. Harvard University Press.
- Rickett, A., & Rickett, A. (1957). Prisoners of liberation. Cameron Associates.
- Seymour, J. D., & Anderson, R. (1998). New ghosts, old ghosts: Prisons and labor reform camps in China. M. E. Sharpe.
- Williams, P. F., & Wu, Y. (2004). The Great Wall of confinement: The Chinese prison camp through contemporary fiction and reportage. University of California Press.
- Wu, H. H. (1992). Laogai: The Chinese gulag (T. Slingerland, Trans.). Westview Press.

=== Collectivization ===
- Bernstein, T. P. (1967). Leadership and mass mobilisation in the Soviet and Chinese collectivisation campaigns of 1929–30 and 1955–56: A comparison. The China Quarterly, 31, 1–47. doi:10.1017/S0305741000028691
- DeMare, B. J. (2019). Land wars: The story of China's agrarian revolution. Stanford University Press.
- Friedman, E., Pickowicz, P. G., & Selden, M. (1991). Chinese village, socialist state. Yale University Press.
- Javed, J. A. (2022). Righteous revolutionaries: Morality, mobilization, and violence in the making of the Chinese state. University of Michigan Press.
- Shue, V. (1980). Peasant China in transition: The dynamics of development toward socialism, 1949–1956. University of California Press.
- Teiwes, F. C., & Sun, W. (Eds.). (1994). The politics of agricultural cooperativization in China: Mao, Deng Zihui, and the "high tide" of 1955. M. E. Sharpe.
- Yang, C. K. (1959). A Chinese village in early Communist transition. Technology Press.

=== Economy ===
- Cliver, R. (2020). Red silk: Class, gender, and revolution in China's Yangzi Delta silk industry. Harvard University Asia Center.
- Frazier, M. W. (2002). The making of the Chinese industrial workplace: State, revolution, and labor management. Cambridge University Press.
- Ghosh, A. (2020). Making it count: Statistics and statecraft in the early People's Republic of China. Princeton University Press.
- Kaple, D. A. (1994). Dream of a red factory: The legacy of high Stalinism in China. Oxford University Press.
- Kirby, W. C. (2006). China's internationalization in the early People's Republic: Dreams of a socialist world economy. The China Quarterly, 188, 870–890. doi:10.1017/S0305741006000476
- Li, H.-Y. (2006). Mao and the economic Stalinization of China, 1948–1953. Rowman & Littlefield.
- Perry, E. J. (1994). Shanghai's strike wave of 1957. The China Quarterly, 137, 1–27. doi:10.1017/S0305741000034020

=== Society and culture ===
- Altehenger, J. (2018). Legal lessons: Popularizing laws in the People's Republic of China, 1949–1989. Harvard University Asia Center.
- Cheng, T., & Selden, M. (1994). The origins and social consequences of China's hukou system. The China Quarterly, 139, 644–668. doi:10.1017/s0305741000043083
- DeMare, B. J. (2015). Mao's cultural army: Drama troupes in China's rural revolution. Cambridge University Press.
- Denton, K. A. (1998). The problematic of self in modern Chinese literature: Hu Feng and Lu Ling. Stanford University Press.
- Diamant, N. J. (2000). Re-examining the impact of the 1950 Marriage Law: State improvisation, local initiative and rural family change. The China Quarterly, 161, 171–198. doi:10.1017/s0305741000003982
- Diamant, N. J. (2000). Revolutionizing the family: Politics, love, and divorce in urban and rural China, 1949–1968. University of California Press.
- Gross, M. (2016). Farewell to the God of Plague: Chairman Mao's campaign to deworm China. University of California Press.
- Hershatter, G. (2011). The gender of memory: Rural women and China's collective past. University of California Press.
- Hung, C.-T. (2011). Mao's new world: Political culture in the early People's Republic. Cornell University Press.
- Lü, X., & Perry, E. J. (Eds.). (1997). Danwei: The changing Chinese workplace in historical and comparative perspective. M. E. Sharpe.
- Nieh, H. (Ed.). (1981). Literature of the Hundred Flowers (Vols. 1–2). Columbia University Press.
- Peterson, G. (1997). The power of words: Literacy and revolution in South China, 1949–95. UBC Press.
- Rogaski, R. (2002). Nature, annihilation, and modernity: China's Korean War germ-warfare experience reconsidered. The Journal of Asian Studies, 61(2), 381–415. JSTOR 2700295
- Volland, N. (2017). Socialist cosmopolitanism: The Chinese literary universe, 1945–1965. Columbia University Press.
- Wang, Z. (2017). Finding women in the state: A socialist feminist revolution in the People's Republic of China, 1949–1964. University of California Press.

==== Religion ====
- Bays, D. H. (2012). A new history of Christianity in China. Wiley-Blackwell.
- Goossaert, V., & Palmer, D. A. (2011). The religious question in modern China. University of Chicago Press.
- Lian, X. (2010). Redeemed by fire: The rise of popular Christianity in modern China. Yale University Press.
- Mariani, P. P. (2011). Church militant: Bishop Kung and Catholic resistance in Communist Shanghai. Harvard University Press.
- Smith, S. A. (2006). Local cadres confront the supernatural: The politics of holy water (shenshui) in the PRC, 1949–1966. The China Quarterly, 188, 999–1022. doi:10.1017/s030574100600052x
- Welch, H. (1972). Buddhism under Mao. Harvard University Press.
- Wickeri, P. L. (1988). Seeking the common ground: Protestant Christianity, the Three-Self Movement, and China's United Front. Orbis Books.

== Nationalities ==
- Dreyer, J. T. (1976). China's forty millions: Minority nationalities and national integration in the People's Republic of China. Harvard University Press.
- Mackerras, C. (1994). China's minorities: Integration and modernization in the twentieth century. Oxford University Press.
- Mullaney, T. S. (2011). Coming to terms with the nation: Ethnic classification in modern China. University of California Press.

=== Tibet ===
- Goldstein, M. C. (2007). A history of modern Tibet: Vol. 2. The calm before the storm, 1951–1955. University of California Press.
- Goldstein, M. C. (2014). A history of modern Tibet: Vol. 3. The storm clouds descend, 1955–1957. University of California Press.
- Goldstein, M. C., Sherap, D., & Siebenschuh, W. R. (2004). A Tibetan revolutionary: The political life and times of Bapa Phüntso Wangye. University of California Press.
- Grunfeld, A. T. (1987). The making of modern Tibet. M. E. Sharpe.
- Shakya, T. (1999). The dragon in the land of snows: A history of modern Tibet since 1947. Columbia University Press.
- Weiner, B. (2020). The Chinese Revolution on the Tibetan frontier. Cornell University Press.

=== Xinjiang ===
- Jacobs, J. (2010). The many deaths of a Kazak unaligned: Osman Batur, Chinese decolonization, and the nationalization of a nomad. The American Historical Review, 115(5), 1291–1314. doi:10.1086/ahr.115.5.1291
- Jacobs, J. M. (2016). Xinjiang and the modern Chinese state. University of Washington Press.
- Kinzley, J. C. (2018). Natural resources and the new frontier: Constructing modern China's borderlands. University of Chicago Press.
- McMillen, D. H. (1979). Chinese Communist power and policy in Xinjiang, 1949–1977. Westview Press.
- McMillen, D. H. (1981). Xinjiang and the Production and Construction Corps: A Han organisation in a non-Han region. The Australian Journal of Chinese Affairs, 6, 65–96. JSTOR 2159052
- Seymour, J. D. (2000). Xinjiang's Production and Construction Corps, and the sinification of Eastern Turkestan. Inner Asia, 2(2), 171–193. doi:10.1163/146481700793647805

=== Inner Mongolia ===
- Bulag, U. E. (2002). The Mongols at China's edge: History and the politics of national unity. Rowman & Littlefield.
- Bulag, U. E. (2006). The yearning for "friendship": Revisiting "the political" in minority revolutionary history in China. The Journal of Asian Studies, 65(1), 3–32. doi:10.1017/s0021911806000040
- Bulag, U. E. (2010). Collaborative nationalism: The politics of friendship on China's Mongolian frontier. Rowman & Littlefield.
- Liu, X. (2006). Reins of liberation: An entangled history of Mongolian independence, Chinese territoriality, and great power hegemony, 1911–1950. Stanford University Press.
- Sneath, D. (2000). Changing Inner Mongolia: Pastoral Mongolian society and the Chinese state. Oxford University Press.

== Foreign relations ==
- Accinelli, R. (1996). Crisis and commitment: United States policy toward Taiwan, 1950–1955. University of North Carolina Press.
- Bernstein, T. P., & Li, H.-Y. (Eds.). (2010). China learns from the Soviet Union, 1949–present. Lexington Books.
- Chang, G. H. (1990). Friends and enemies: The United States, China, and the Soviet Union, 1948–1972. Stanford University Press.
- Chang, G. H., & He, D. (1993). The absence of war in the U.S.-China confrontation over Quemoy and Matsu in 1954–1955: Contingency, luck, deterrence? The American Historical Review, 98(5), 1500–1524. doi:10.1086/ahr/98.5.1500
- Chen, J. (2001). Mao's China and the Cold War. University of North Carolina Press.
- Christensen, T. J. (1996). Useful adversaries: Grand strategy, domestic mobilization, and Sino-American conflict, 1947–1958. Princeton University Press.
- Rushkoff, B. C. (1981). Eisenhower, Dulles and the Quemoy-Matsu crisis, 1954–1955. Political Science Quarterly, 96(3), 465–480. JSTOR 2150556
- Tucker, N. B. (1983). Patterns in the dust: Chinese-American relations and the recognition controversy, 1949–1950. Columbia University Press.
- Westad, O. A. (Ed.). (1998). Brothers in arms: The rise and fall of the Sino-Soviet alliance, 1945–1963. Stanford University Press.
- Zhai, Q. (1994). The dragon, the lion, and the eagle: Chinese-British-American relations, 1949–1958. Kent State University Press.
- Zhang, S. G. (1993). Deterrence and strategic culture: Chinese-American confrontations, 1949–1958. Cornell University Press.

=== Korean War ===
- Chang, D. C. (2020). The hijacked war: The story of Chinese POWs in the Korean War. Stanford University Press.
- Chen, J. (1994). China's road to the Korean War: The making of the Sino-American confrontation. Columbia University Press.
- Foot, R. (1990). A substitute for victory: The politics of peacemaking at the Korean armistice talks. Cornell University Press.
- Goncharov, S. N., Lewis, J. W., & Xue, L. (1993). Uncertain partners: Stalin, Mao, and the Korean War. Stanford University Press.
- Hao, Y., & Zhai, Z. (1990). China's decision to enter the Korean War: History revisted. The China Quarterly, 121, 94–115. doi:10.1017/S0305741000013527
- Li, X. (2014). China's battle for Korea: The 1951 spring offensive. Indiana University Press.
- Li, X., Millett, A. R., & Yu, B. (Trans. & Eds.). (2001). Mao's generals remember Korea. University Press of Kansas.
- Shen, Z. (2012). Mao, Stalin and the Korean War: Trilateral communist relations in the 1950s (N. Silver, Trans.). Routledge.
- Whiting, A. S. (1960). China crosses the Yalu: The decision to enter the Korean War. Macmillan.
- Zhang, S. G. (1995). Mao's military romanticism: China and the Korean War, 1950–1953. University Press of Kansas.

== Biographies ==
- Bachman, D. M. (1985). Chen Yun and the Chinese political system. Institute of East Asian Studies, University of California, Berkeley.
- Barnouin, B., & Yu, C. (2006). Zhou Enlai: A political life. Chinese University Press.
- Byron, J., & Pack, R. (1992). The claws of the dragon: Kang Sheng, the evil genius behind Mao and his legacy of terror in People's China. Simon & Schuster.
- Chang, J., & Halliday, J. (2005). Mao: The unknown story. Jonathan Cape.
- Chen, J. (2024). Zhou Enlai: A life. Belknap Press of Harvard University Press.
- Domes, J. (1985). Peng Te-huai: The man and the image. Stanford University Press.
- Gao, W. (2007). Zhou Enlai: The last perfect revolutionary: A biography (P. Rand & L. R. Sullivan, Trans.). PublicAffairs. (Original work published 2003)
- Hung, R. Y. Y. (2020). Hu Feng: A Marxist intellectual in a communist state, 1930–1955. SUNY Press.
- Pantsov, A. V., & Levine, S. I. (2012). Mao: The real story. Simon & Schuster.
- Pantsov, A. V., & Levine, S. I. (2015). Deng Xiaoping: A revolutionary life. Oxford University Press.
- Potter, P. B. (2003). From Leninist discipline to socialist legalism: Peng Zhen on law and political authority in the PRC. Stanford University Press.
- Schram, S. (1966). Mao Tse-tung. Penguin Books.
- Short, P. (1999). Mao: A life. Hodder & Stoughton.
- Spence, J. D. (1999). Mao Zedong. Viking.
- Terrill, R. (1980). Mao: A biography. Harper & Row.
- Wilson, D. (1984). Chou: The story of Zhou Enlai, 1898–1976. Hutchinson.

== Historiography and memory studies ==
=== Historiography ===
- Esherick, J. W. (1995). Ten theses on the Chinese Revolution. Modern China, 21(1), 45–76. doi:10.1177/009770049502100103
- Kraus, C. (2016). Researching the history of the People's Republic of China (Cold War International History Project Working Paper No. 79). Woodrow Wilson International Center for Scholars.
- Li, H. (2012). Reinventing modern China: Imagination and authenticity in Chinese historical writing. University of Hawai'i Press.
- Perry, E. J. (2016). The promise of PRC history. Journal of Modern Chinese History, 10(1), 113–117. doi:10.1080/17535654.2016.1168172
- Strauss, J. C. (2006). Introduction: In search of PRC history. The China Quarterly, 188, 855–869. doi:10.1017/S0305741006000464
- Strauss, J. C. (Ed.). (2007). The history of the PRC (1949–1976). Cambridge University Press.
- Unger, J. (Ed.). (1993). Using the past to serve the present: Historiography and politics in contemporary China. M. E. Sharpe.
- Weigelin-Schwiedrzik, S. (1996). On shi and lun: Toward a typology of historiography in the PRC. History and Theory, 35(4). JSTOR 2505445
- Weigelin-Schwiedrzik, S. (2006). In search of a master narrative for 20th-century Chinese history. The China Quarterly, 188, 1070–1091. doi:10.1017/S0305741006000555

=== Memory studies ===
- Barmé, G. R. (1996). Shades of Mao: The posthumous cult of the great leader. M. E. Sharpe.
- Cheek, T. (2010). Mao, revolution, and memory. In T. Cheek (Ed.), A critical introduction to Mao (pp. 3–30). Cambridge University Press. doi:10.1017/CBO9780511781476.003
- Denton, K. A. (2014). Exhibiting the past: Historical memory and the politics of museums in postsocialist China. University of Hawai'i Press.
- Jung, K.-S. (2015). China's memory and commemoration of the Korean War in the Memorial Hall of the "War to Resist U.S. Aggression and Aid Korea". Cross-Currents: East Asian History and Culture Review, 4(1), 14–39. doi:10.1353/ach.2015.0027
- Lee, C. K., & Yang, G. (Eds.). (2007). Re-envisioning the Chinese Revolution: The politics and poetics of collective memory in reform China. Woodrow Wilson Center Press; Stanford University Press.
- Leese, D., & Shuman, A. (Eds.). (2023). Justice after Mao: The politics of historical truth in the People's Republic of China. Cambridge University Press. doi:10.1017/9781009261265
- Li, J. (2020). Utopian ruins: A memorial museum of the Mao era. Duke University Press. doi:10.1215/9781478012764
- Veg, S. (2014). Testimony, history and ethics: From the memory of Jiabiangou prison camp to a reappraisal of the Anti-Rightist Movement in present-day China. The China Quarterly, 218, 514–539. doi:10.1017/S0305741014000368
- Veg, S. (Ed.). (2019). Popular memories of the Mao era: From critical debate to reassessing history. Hong Kong University Press.
- Wu, G. (2014). Recalling bitterness: Historiography, memory, and myth in Maoist China. Twentieth-Century China, 39(3), 245–268. doi:10.1179/1521538514Z.00000000047

== Primary sources ==
Primary sources include writings and speeches by party leaders, memoirs and eyewitness accounts, and official documents of the government and the Chinese Communist Party.

=== General ===
- Communist China, 1955–1959: Policy documents with analysis. (1962). Harvard University Press.
- Doolin, D. J. (Trans.). (1964). Communist China: The politics of student opposition. Hoover Institution on War, Revolution and Peace.
- Kau, M. Y. M., & Leung, J. K. (Eds.). (1986). The writings of Mao Zedong, 1949–1976: Vol. 1. September 1949–December 1955. M. E. Sharpe.
- Kau, M. Y. M., & Leung, J. K. (Eds.). (1992). The writings of Mao Zedong, 1949–1976: Vol. 2. January 1956–December 1957. M. E. Sharpe.
- Liu, S. (1969). Collected works of Liu Shao-ch'i, 1945–1957. Union Research Institute.
- MacFarquhar, R., Cheek, T., & Wu, E. (Eds.). (1989). The secret speeches of Chairman Mao: From the Hundred Flowers to the Great Leap Forward. Council on East Asian Studies, Harvard University.
- Mao, T. (1957). On the correct handling of contradictions among the people. Foreign Languages Press.
- Mao, T. (1963). The political thought of Mao Tse-tung (S. R. Schram, Ed.). Praeger.
- Mao, T. (1977). Selected works of Mao Tse-tung (Vol. 5). Foreign Languages Press.
- Schurmann, F., & Schell, O. (Eds.). (1967). Communist China: Revolutionary reconstruction and international confrontation, 1949 to the present. Vintage Books.
- Selden, M. (Ed.). (1979). The People's Republic of China: A documentary history of revolutionary change. Monthly Review Press.

=== Memoirs ===
- Chow, C.-W. (1960). Ten years of storm: The true story of the communist regime in China. Holt, Rinehart and Winston.
- Crook, I., & Crook, D. (1959). Revolution in a Chinese village: Ten Mile Inn. Routledge & Kegan Paul.
- Dalai Lama XIV. (1962). My land and my people. McGraw-Hill.
- Ford, R. (1957). Captured in Tibet. Harrap.
- Gao, E. (2009). In search of my homeland: A memoir of a Chinese labor camp (R. Dorsett & D. Pollard, Trans.). Ecco.
- Hinton, W. (1966). Fanshen: A documentary of revolution in a Chinese village. Monthly Review Press.
- Li, Z. (1994). The private life of Chairman Mao: The memoirs of Mao's personal physician (H.-C. Tai, Trans.). Random House.
- Liu, S.-T. (1953). Out of Red China (J. Chia & H. Walter, Trans.). Duell, Sloan and Pearce. (Original work published 1953)
- Loh, R., & Evans, H. (1962). Escape from Red China. Coward-McCann.
- Nie, R. (1988). Inside the Red Star: The memoirs of Marshal Nie Rongzhen. New World Press.
- Peng, D. (1984). Memoirs of a Chinese marshal: The autobiographical notes of Peng Dehuai (1898–1974) (L. Zheng, Trans.). Foreign Languages Press.
- Rittenberg, S., & Bennett, A. (1993). The man who stayed behind. Simon & Schuster.
- Shapiro, S. (1979). An American in China: Thirty years in the People's Republic. New World Press.
- Tung, C.-P., & Evans, H. (1966). The thought revolution. Coward-McCann.
- Wu, N., & Li, Y. (1993). A single tear: A family's persecution, love, and endurance in Communist China. Atlantic Monthly Press.
- Wu, X. (1985). Eight years in the Ministry of Foreign Affairs (January 1950–October 1958): Memoirs of a diplomat. New World Press.
- Yue, D., & Wakeman, C. (1985). To the storm: The odyssey of a revolutionary Chinese woman. University of California Press.
- Zhang, X. (1994). Grass soup (M. Avery, Trans.). Secker & Warburg.

=== Government documents ===
- The Agrarian Reform Law of the People's Republic of China, together with other relevant documents. (1950). Foreign Languages Press.
- Chou, E. (1956). Report on the proposals for the second five-year plan for development of the national economy. Foreign Languages Press. (Note: Published in one volume with the Proposals of the Eighth National Congress of the Communist Party of China for the second five-year plan for development of the national economy, 1958–1962.)
- The Common Program and other documents of the First Plenary Session of the Chinese People's Political Consultative Conference. (1950). Foreign Languages Press.
- Constitution of the People's Republic of China: Adopted on September 20, 1954 by the First National People's Congress of the People's Republic of China at its first session. (1954). Foreign Languages Press.
- Documents of Chinese Communist Party Central Committee, Sept. 1956–Apr. 1969 (Vol. 1). (1971). Union Research Institute.
- Documents of the First Session of the First National People's Congress of the People's Republic of China. (1955). Foreign Languages Press.
- Eighth National Congress of the Communist Party of China (Vols. 1–3). (1956). Foreign Languages Press.
- First five-year plan for development of the national economy of the People's Republic of China in 1953–1957. (1956). Foreign Languages Press.
- Important documents concerning the question of Taiwan. (1955). Foreign Languages Press.
- Liu, S. (1954). Report on the draft constitution of the People's Republic of China. Foreign Languages Press.
- The Marriage Law of the People's Republic of China, together with other relevant articles. (1950). Foreign Languages Press.
- Resolution on CPC history (1949–81). (1981). Foreign Languages Press. (Note: Contains the full text of the Resolution on Certain Questions in the History of Our Party since the Founding of the People's Republic of China, adopted by the Sixth Plenary Session of the 11th Central Committee in June 1981.)

== See also ==
- 1st Five-Year Plan (China)
- Anti-Rightist Campaign
- Bandung Conference
- Bibliography of Chinese history
- Bibliography of the Cold War
- Bibliography of the Korean War
- Campaign to Suppress Counterrevolutionaries
- China in the Korean War
- Common Program
- Five Principles of Peaceful Coexistence
- History of the People's Republic of China (1949–1976)
- Hundred Flowers Campaign
- Land Reform Movement
- Laogai
- Maoism
- New Marriage Law
- Proclamation of the People's Republic of China
- Sino-Soviet relations
- Three-anti and Five-anti Campaigns
