= Ghost Flames =

2020 non-fiction book by Charles J. Hanley

Ghost Flames: Life and Death in a Hidden War, Korea 1950–1953
- Author: Charles J. Hanley
- Language: English
- Subject: Korean War
- Genre: Narrative history
- Publisher: PublicAffairs
- Publication date: August 25, 2020
- Publication place: United States
- Pages: 504
- ISBN: 978-1-5417-6817-8

Ghost Flames: Life and Death in a Hidden War, Korea 1950-1953 is a non-fiction narrative history of the Korean War written by Charles J. Hanley and published in August 2020 by PublicAffairs, an imprint of Perseus Books Group, part of the Hachette Book Group. The book tells the story of the war through the experiences of 20 individuals who lived through it, of several nationalities and walks of life.

== Synopsis ==
The present-tense narrative unfolds chronologically in interwoven episodes describing the experiences of featured individuals, beginning with that of a North Korean refugee girl in Seoul, South Korea, on June 25, 1950, the morning the war began with an invasion of the South by the northern army.

The other protagonists are a North Korean communist party functionary; a mother of two in Seoul; Major General Yu Song-chol, the North Korean army operations chief; Lieutenant General Matthew B. Ridgway, the U.S. army’s operations chief; a North Korean Naval Academy cadet; a black American infantryman; a Maryknoll nun; a northern medical student; a U.S. 1st Cavalry Division soldier; a Korean journalist in Seoul; a British communist journalist; a Seoul high school student; a high school student from Kochang, South Korea; a female Seoul university student; a Chinese interpreter at the truce talks; a U.S. Marine officer; a U.S. 7th Infantry Division soldier; overall Chinese commander General Peng Teh-huai; and a Chinese army medic.

These individuals observe or participate in the war’s major events: the U.S.-South Korean retreat into the defensive Pusan Perimeter; the Inchon Landing; the breakout from the perimeter; the U.S.-South Korean drive deep into North Korea; the intervention of the Chinese army on North Korea’s side; the seesawing battles over the peninsula’s midsection; the trench warfare of 1951–1953; the truce talks; the signing of an armistice on July 27, 1953.

Protagonists also witness or are caught up in the war’s atrocities, including the secret mass executions of tens of thousands of political prisoners in South Korea; the Americans’ massacre of hundreds of southern refugees at No Gun Ri; the U.S. aerial strafing of southern refugee columns; the indiscriminate U.S. bombing of northern civilian centers; the North Koreans’ summary “people’s court” executions of police and other southern officials.

The 504-page volume also includes six maps, a war chronology, 60 photos of general war scenes and of the protagonists, and epilogues, including a section briefly recounting their postwar lives.

== Reviews ==
The three major publishing industry magazines all awarded Ghost Flames “starred” reviews.

Kirkus Reviews called it “a masterly new history. … The accretion of astounding detail makes for a vivid, multilayered look at a deeply complicated war in which few emerged as heroic. A top-notch addition to the literature on the Korean War."

Publishers Weekly wrote, "Hanley paints an extraordinary portrait of the war's complexity and devastation. This is an essential account of America's ‘forgotten war’." In Library Journal, reviewer Michael Rodriguez described it as “an extraordinary kaleidoscope of human experiences in a catastrophic forgotten war."

In The New York Times, reviewer Gordon G. Chang wrote, “In unforgettable fashion, Hanley, a Pulitzer Prize winner, tells the story of the Korean War, one of the most savage conflicts in history, through eyewitness accounts of 20 people, most of them victims.”

The Wall Street Journal’s Arthur Herman found Ghost Flames to be a “harrowing account, in all its vivid detail” and “compelling reading” that “delves into the darker recesses of this conflict.” But he criticized what he contended was an effort to draw “moral equivalence” between the two sides, claiming instead that North Korea bore responsibility for all the estimated 3 million deaths for having started the war. The online Lifestyle Asia called Ghost Flames "a piece of historical non-fiction like no other. ... each story is a harrowing point of view on the realities of war."

Reviewing the book in the journal Asian Perspective, international affairs expert Walter C. Clemens Jr. praised Hanley as “an experienced war reporter and a sensitive human being, but also a careful scholar,” and asked, “Is there another history book that describes any war from so many angles, so many sides – and does so this gracefully?”

== Publication ==
The rights to Ghost Flames were sold to Clive Priddle at PublicAffairs in July 2018 by Peter Bernstein and Amy Bernstein at Bernstein Literary Agency. An original spring 2020 publication date was postponed to August 2020 because of the global coronavirus crisis. A Korean translation (titled “고스트 플레임”) was published in 2025 by Marco Polo Press of Sejong-si, South Korea.
