= Choe Sang-Hun =

South Korean journalist (born 1962)

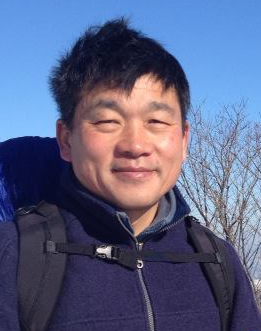
- Choe Sang-Hun in Seoul, January 2013
- Born: 1962 (age 63–64); Ulsan, South Korea
- Education: Yeungnam University (BA); Hankuk University of Foreign Studies
- Occupation: Journalist
- Writing career
- Notable work: Coverage of No Gun Ri Massacre
- Notable awards: Pulitzer Prize for Investigative Reporting in 2000

Korean name
- Hangul: 최상훈
- RR: Choe Sanghun
- MR: Ch'oe Sanghun

Choe Sang-Hun (Korean: 최상훈, born 1962) is a South Korean journalist. He has received a Pulitzer Prize and is Seoul Bureau Chief for The New York Times.

== Early life ==
Choe was born in Ulju County, Ulsan, South Korea. He received a B.A. in Economics from Yeungnam University and a master's degree in interpretation and translation from the Hankuk University of Foreign Studies in Seoul.

== Career ==
Choe began his journalism career as a political reporter at The Korea Herald, an English-language daily. He joined the Associated Press's Seoul Bureau in 1994 and covered natural disasters, North Korea and 1997 Asian financial crisis.

In 2000, he won the Pulitzer Prize in the Investigative Reporting along with Charles J. Hanley and Martha Mendoza for uncovering the massacre of Korean civilians by U.S. soldiers at the No Gun Ri bridge during the Korean War. The series of investigative reports they produced on the No Gun Ri Massacre and similar incidents during the Korean War, published between September and December 1999, helped trigger broader private and government-sponsored investigations of wartime atrocities. He was the first Korean to receive a Pulitzer Prize.

He joined The New York Times (then the International Herald Tribune) in 2005 as its Korea Correspondent. He covered Cyclone Nargis in Myanmar in 2008 with four other reporters from the International Herald Tribune, winning awards, including Asia Society’s Osborn Elliott Prize for Excellence in Journalism on Asia. In 2018, Choe was a member of the team of New York Times reporters who won the Overseas Press Club's Bob Considine Award for best newspaper, news service or digital interpretation of international affairs for its coverage of North Korea’s nuclear arsenal.

He was a 2010–2011 Koret Fellow in the Korean Studies Program at the Walter H. Shorenstein Asia-Pacific Research Center, part of Stanford University's Freeman Spogli Institute for International Studies.

== Awards ==
- 1999 Worth Bingham Prize
- 1999 Overseas Press Club's Madeline Dane Ross Award
- 2000 Pulitzer Prize for Investigative Reporting
- 2000 George Polk Awards
- 2000 International Consortium of Investigative Journalists Award
- 2000 Johns Hopkins University SAIS-Novartis International Journalism Award
- 2007 Human Rights Press Awards
- 2009 Asia Society’s Osborn Elliott Prize for Excellence in Journalism
- 2018 Overseas Press Club's Bob Considine Award

== Works ==
- Hanley, Charles J.; Choe, Sang-Hun; Mendoza, Martha (2001), The Bridge at No Gun Ri: a hidden nightmare from the Korean War, New York: Henry Holt and Co., ISBN 978-0-8050-6658-6, OCLC 46872329
- Choe, Sang-Hun; Torchia, Christopher (2002), How Korean Talk: A Collection of Expressions, Seoul: Unhengnamu, ISBN 978-8-9879-7695-2, OCLC 820945501
- Kirk, Donald; Choe, Sang-Hun (2006), Korea Witness: 135 years of war, crisis and news in the land of the morning calm, Seoul: Eunhaeng Namu, ISBN 978-89-5660-155-7, OCLC 708318187
- Choe, Sang-Hun; Torchia, Christopher (2006), Looking for Mr. Kim in Seoul: a guide to Korean expressions, New York: Infini Press, ISBN 978-1-932457-03-2, OCLC 123193849
