= The Fifties (book) =

1993 history book by David Halberstam

- First edition
- Author: David Halberstam
- Language: English
- Subject: United States in the 1950s
- Genre: History
- Publisher: Villard
- Publication date: 1993
- Publication place: United States
- ISBN: 9780679415596

The Fifties (1993) is a history book by David Halberstam centered on the decade of the 1950s in the United States.

== Synopsis ==
Rather than using a straightforward linear narrative, Halberstam separately profiles many of the notable trends and people of the post-war era, starting with Harry S. Truman's stunning presidential victory in 1948 against Thomas E. Dewey. Halberstam chronicles political and cultural trends during the decade, including the beginnings of the Civil Rights Movement and the Cold War, the creation of rock and roll via the rise of Elvis Presley, the introduction of fast food and mass marketing via the rise of McDonald's, the Holiday Inn hotel chain, the transformation of General Motors into the center of new car culture through the work of designer Harley Earl, the beginnings of the sexual revolution with the creation of the birth control pill, and the beginnings of the American counterculture through the emergence of actors Marlon Brando and James Dean and Beat Generation writers Jack Kerouac and Allen Ginsberg. The book ends with an account of the first televised debate between Richard Nixon and John F. Kennedy, serving as a prelude to the 1960s.

== Legacy ==
Journalist Frye Gaillard cited it as an inspiration for his book A Hard Rain: America in the 1960s. A documentary adaptation of the book, co-directed by future Academy Award-winning filmmaker Alex Gibney, was aired in 1997 on The History Channel.

== Editions ==
- Halberstam, David (1993). The Fifties. New York: Villard Books. ISBN 9780679415596. OCLC 27188295. "First edition"
