= The Breaks of the Game =

1981 book by David Halberstam

- First edition cover
- Author: David Halberstam
- Language: English
- Genre: Sports
- Publisher: Knopf
- Publication date: 1981
- Publication place: United States
- Media type: Print (Hardback & Paperback)
- Pages: 362

The Breaks of the Game is a 1981 sports book written by Pulitzer Prize winning reporter David Halberstam about the Portland Trail Blazers' 1979–1980 season. Aside from a recap of the Blazers' season, the book attempts to give a detailed history of the NBA, the 1976–77 Portland Trail Blazers championship team, the injuries faced by departed star Bill Walton, and the life of Kermit Washington after his two-month suspension for punching Rudy Tomjanovich. The book also puts basketball into a social context and contains extensive discussion on race in the NBA.

At the time of its release, the New York Times gave it high praise. The book was also given a positive review by Sports Illustrated upon its release, and later listed number 17 in Sports Illustrated's list of best sports books ever written. Popular sportswriter and television producer Bill Simmons has repeatedly talked of his admiration for the book.

== Background ==
The 1977 NBA championship Blazers team was a young team built around Bill Walton, Maurice Lucas, and Lionel Hollins, and coached by Jack Ramsay. After winning the championship they started the 1977–78 season with a league best 50–10 record before Walton broke his foot, and when he came back to play in the playoffs, he re-injured the foot. Walton was nonetheless named Most Valuable Player of the league for that season. Before the next season Walton was disgruntled because he felt that the Portland medical staff should not have cleared him to play in the playoffs. He sat out the following season in protest. He was traded to the San Diego Clippers shortly before the 1979–80 season.

Kermit Washington arrived on the Blazers in the trade that sent Walton out. While with the Los Angeles Lakers in 1977, Washington threw a punch which nearly killed Rudy Tomjanovich. He was suspended for the remainder of the season because of the incident, and Tomjanovich retired after the 1980-1981 season.

== Content ==
Halberstam worked as an embedded reporter and traveled with the team during the season. Apart from the central discussion of the 1979–80 Blazers season, Breaks provides a history of the NBA, discusses the 1977 Portland Trail Blazers NBA championship squad, the life of departed star Bill Walton, and the struggles of Kermit Washington after his 1977 suspension. The book describes Washington's difficult upbringing and his struggles with the stigma that has become attached to him and his family because of that incident. Late season Continental League pickup Billy Ray Bates struggle from illiterate small town player who bounced around the fringes of the NBA for several years to playoff starter is also chronicled. Halberstam provides background by discussing the history of the Portland Trail Blazers franchise. The book also puts basketball into a social context and contains extensive discussion on race in the NBA. Portions also discuss the growing pains the NBA experienced expanding from a game that was rarely featured on television in the 1960s to one that had a lucrative network contract by 1979. The television money and increased fan support brought with it with the advent of lucrative "no-cut contracts" for the players. Halberstam argues that because of this, the league has reached a point where the players often have more power than the coach. Woven into the narrative are biographical passages for Ramsay, Walton, and Washington (among others) and the misfortunes they each suffered in recent seasons. The Blazers made the playoffs behind the play of Washington and others, but are eliminated in the first round.

The story of each players' and coaches' lives act as the track upon which Halberstam advances his themes of racism in America, class-ism, white privilege, and labor rights and disputes. Put within the context of the sports world, especially ABA and NBA which saw the influx of black players at the same time the US civil rights issues were happening, race and worker's rights are especially prevalent and easily comprehended. Tracking the life of Maurice Lucas who came to be known as the "Enforcer" for his rough play on the court and aggressive nature, honed his skills on East coast play grounds. He was a product of the ghetto, and felt he was wronged when he felt he should earn as much money as other, white, players in his same position. The friction caused much turmoil for the Blazers and was indicative of the struggle many black athletes experienced across the league during the 1970s.

The rebounder grew up in the worst part of Pittsburgh, had his life saved by basketball, then spent much of his professional career hoping to extricate himself from bad contracts and bad advice. He just wanted to get paid. He deserved to get paid. Instead of feeling fortunate for playing with the big redhead – they were perfect together, just like everything else about that team – he never forgot for a second that the big redhead was making four times as much money. He couldn't get past it. When the team fell apart, so did he. Eventually, they traded him for 40 cents on the dollar and he finally got paid, only he never played for another great team. You could say he got what he deserved. Or, you could say he was justified all along.

Bill Walton's personal story was used to display the manner in which owners and teams dealt with worker's rights, or in this case, player's rights, specifically in regards to their health. Walton was chronically injuring his feet and legs. He suffered a foot injury that he felt was not dealt with appropriately by the Blazers' training and medical staff. Walton felt he was being forced to play through pain and that his body and eventually his career would suffer for it. He sued the team after being traded. The message within this story is the struggles of team and player's to earn each other's trust and work with each other prolong the player's careers and make sure the team's are getting max return on their "investments", so-to-speak.

The big redhead anchored the perfect team in college, then spent his professional career wondering if it would ever happen again. Slowly, he watched the right nucleus form around him, quick guards and heady players who intrinsically understood where to go and what to do. The entire team became an extension of him – his mind, his skills, his passing, his rebounding, his unselfishness, his enthusiasm, his everything. When his fragile feet betrayed him while they were defending their first title, a member of the team's medical staff convinced him to try a painkiller injection for the playoffs. Didn't work. He blamed the organization and signed with another franchise for a ton of money, obliterating the perfect team and suffering an especially painful divorce with his coach. What he didn't know was that basketball wouldn't make him happy again for another seven years. Eventually, you could say he was haunted.

Throughout the entire book, the overarching narrative is of personal and professional redemption, of the importance of peeling back the layers of some of the more vulnerable people in contemporary society, and to marvel at what can be found beneath.

"Just as the camera had caught and transmitted the true intensity of old-fashioned rivalries in the earlier days of the league, so it now caught with equal fidelity the increasing lethargy and indifference of many players in regular season games, a lethargy and indifference now seen by a largely white audience as at least partially racial in origin."

== Reception ==
The book received positive reviews. In The New York Times book review at the time of its release, Christopher Lehmann-Haupt called it "one of the best books I've ever read about American sports." The book was also given a positive review by Sports Illustrated upon its release. In 2002 Sports Illustrated listed the book number 17 in their list of the top 100 books ever written on sports.

New York Times: "Few subjects come to mind that can provide a better overall view of America in the 1960s and 1970's than pro basketball does. That's why it has attracted as restless an intelligence as David Halberstam's. And that's why 'The Breaks of the Game' is at the very least one of the best books I've ever read about American sports."

Journalist, podcast host, and New York Times best-selling author Bill Simmons has repeatedly praised the book. Simmons stated that he considers it the best book ever written on basketball, a template for good sports writing, and the force that propelled him into a career as a sportswriter:

More importantly, I didn't understand how to write. I had written short stories as a little kid, read every book in sight, even finished every Hardy Boys book before I turned ten. But I didn't know how to write. "Breaks of the Game" was the first big-boy book I ever loved. Within a few pages, I came to believe that he wrote the book just for me. I plowed through it in one weekend. A few months later, I read it again. Eventually, I read the book so many times that the spine of the book crumbled, so I bought the paperback version to replace it. Through college and grad school, as I was slowly deciding on a career, I read it every year to remind myself how to write – how to save words, how to construct a sentence, how to tell someone's life story without relying on quotes, how to make anecdotes come alive. It was my own personal writing seminar. When the paperback suffered a tragic beach accident from an unexpected wave, I bought a third copy at the used books store on Newbury Street for $5.95. Best deal of my life. Every two years, I read that book again to make sure that my writing hasn't slipped too much. Like a golfer visiting his old instructor to check on his swing.

== Main players ==
Kermit Washington

POR 1979–80 Pts/Reb/Ast	POR 1980–81 Pts/Reb/Ast	POR 1981–82 Pts/Reb/Ast
13.4	11.4	5.0
10.5	9.4	5.9
2.1	2.0	1.5

Bill Walton

POR 1974–75 Pts/Reb/Ast	POR 1975–76 Pts/Reb/Ast	POR 1976–77 Pts/Reb/Ast	POR 1977–78 Pts/Reb/Ast
12.8	16.1	18.6	18.9
12.6	13.4	14.4	13.2
4.8	4.3	3.8	5.0

Maurice Lucas

POR 1976/77 Pts/Reb/Ast	POR 1977/78 Pts/Reb/Ast	POR 1978/79 Pts/Reb/Ast
20.2	16.4	20.4
11.4	9.1	10.4
2.9	2.5	3.1
