= Michael J. Halberstam =

American cardiologist and author

- Born: Michael Joseph Halberstam; August 9, 1932; The Bronx, New York
- Died: December 5, 1980 (aged 48); Washington, D.C.
- Cause of death: Homicide
- Education: M.D., Boston University School of Medicine
- Occupations: Cardiologist, author
- Years active: 1962–1980
- Relatives: David Halberstam (brother); Elliott Jones (spouse)

Michael Joseph Halberstam (August 9, 1932 – December 5, 1980) was an American cardiologist and author. In 1980 Halberstam was fatally shot during an attempted burglary of his residence in Washington, D.C.

== Early life and education ==
Halberstam was born on August 9, 1932, in The Bronx, New York, the first of two sons for Dr. Charles Abraham, a U.S. Army surgeon and Blanche Levy Halberstam, a teacher. Halberstam's younger brother was the award-winning journalist and historian David Halberstam.

Halberstam attended Harvard College, where he was managing editor of The Harvard Crimson (as his brother David would also be) and won the Dana Reed Prize for the best piece of writing published in a Harvard student publication. Halberstam earned an A.B. in History with honors from Harvard in 1953 and earned a M.D. from the Boston University School of Medicine in 1957.

== Career ==
Halberstam served in the U.S. Public Health Service, then completed his internship and residency in New York City and Burlington, Vermont. In 1962 Halberstam became a fellow in cardiology at George Washington University Hospital and later taught at the university's medical school. Halberstam established a private practice in 1964.

In addition to medical papers in his field, Halberstam wrote on topics including Medicare and litigation against physicians, as well as television reviews of medical shows like Marcus Welby, M.D. In 1978 Halberstam wrote a novel, The Wanting of Levine, about a self-made millionaire real estate investor who becomes the first Jewish U.S. president. In 2017 journalist Ira Stoll described The Wanting of Levine as having "most cannily anticipated" the presidency of Donald Trump.

== Death ==
On December 5, 1980, Halberstam was shot at his Washington, D.C. home by Bernard C. Welch Jr., a prolific thief and escaped convict who lived in nearby Great Falls, Virginia. Halberstam and his wife surprised Welch when they returned home that evening to find Welch burglarizing their house.

Despite having been shot twice in the chest by Welch, Halberstam told his wife to get into their car, and he drove them toward Sibley Hospital. On the way to the hospital, Halberstam saw Welch, shouted, "That's the guy!" and swerved to hit him. Welch was wounded, but not fatally injured. Halberstam crashed his car into a tree near the hospital, and was taken to the emergency room by ambulance. Halberstam died on the operating table approximately 90 minutes after he was shot. District of Columbia police arrested the wounded Welch. At Welch's trial, the prosecuting attorney pointed at him, and used Halberstam's words, "That's the guy!"

Welch received life sentences for one count each of felony murder and second-degree armed burglary, to be served concurrently, four counts of burglary and four counts of grand larceny totaling 143 years.

Halberstam's widow, Elliott Jones, filed a successful wrongful death suit against Welch and his common-law wife on behalf of Halberstam's estate, and was awarded a $5.7 million judgment. Bernard Welch died in prison in 1997. The precedent set by the case, Halberstam v. Welch, was used in the Justice Against Sponsors of Terrorism Act.

== Selected bibliography ==
- — (1978). The wanting of Levine (First ed.). Lippincott. ISBN 978-0397010936. LCCN 78002650. OCLC 3705603. OL 4716251M – via Internet Archive.
- A Coronary Event (1976)
- The Pills in Your Life (1973)
- Making the rounds with Sir William (1974)
