= Donald Kirk =

American journalist

- Education: (Bachelor's degree), (Master's degree in International relations); Doctorate Honorary
- Alma mater: Princeton University, University of Chicago & University of Maryland University College
- Occupations: Correspondent, Journalist & Author
- Organization(s): National Press Club (Washington), Foreign Correspondents' Club (Hong Kong), Institute for Corean-American Studies, Seoul Foreign Correspondents’ Club, Overseas Press Club of America, International House of Japan, Authors Guild of America, Society of Professional Journalists, American Society of Journalists and Authors
- Awards: Overseas Press Club of America Award (1974); George Polk Awards (1975); Edward Scott Beck award (1974); Chicago Newspaper Guild Page-One Award (1962)
- Website: www.donaldkirk.com

Donald Kirk is a veteran correspondent and author on conflict and crisis from Southeast Asia to the Middle East to Northeast Asia. Kirk has covered wars from Vietnam to Iraq, focusing on political, diplomatic, economic and social as well as military issues. He is also known for his reporting on North Korea, including the nuclear crisis, human rights and payoffs from South to North Korea preceding the June 2000 inter-Korean summit.[1]

== Career ==
After several years as a metro reporter for the Chicago Sun-Times and the New York Post, 1960-1964, Kirk free-lanced from Indonesia in “The Year of Living Dangerously,” 1965–1966, writing about the fall of Sukarno and mass killings in Java and Bali. He covered Vietnam, Cambodia and Laos in the late 1960s and early 1970s for the old Washington (DC) Star and then for the Chicago Tribune, reporting on the 1968 Tet Offensive, the 1970 downfall of Prince Sihanouk and the U.S. incursion into Cambodia and the 1972 Easter Offensive in Vietnam. He also wrote articles for The New York Times Magazine and The New Leader and two books before gravitating to northeast Asia.

Kirk was correspondent for The Observer (London) in Japan and Korea from the late 1970s to 1982, covering the assassination of President Park Chung-hee of Korea in 1979, the 1980 Gwangju revolt, and financial, diplomatic and political issues in Japan for The Observer and newspapers in the U.S. and Canada. After covering the Israeli invasion of Lebanon in 1982 from Beirut and Tel Aviv, he joined USA Today in August 1982 as the paper's first world editor. For USA Today, he ranged from Europe to Asia, reporting on war in Lebanon, revolt in El Salvador and Nicaragua, the 1985-1986 People Power revolution in the Philippines, the democracy revolt in Korea, the 1988 Seoul Olympics, the 1989 Tiananmen Square uprising, the 1989 fall of Ceausescu, and the Gulf War from Baghdad, including the U.S. bombing, 1990-91.

After publishing an unauthorized biography of Chung Ju-yung, founder of the Hyundai empire, in 1994, Kirk served in Korea as correspondent for the International Herald Tribune, 1997–2003, and the Christian Science Monitor and CBS Radio, 2004-2020, covering the sinking of the South Korean navy ship Cheonan and the shelling of Yeonpyeong Island in 2010, North Korean nuclear and missile tests, anti-American protests, U.S.-Korea trade disputes and Korean politics. He has visited North Korea eight times, writing for Forbes Asia and others, and reported for Institutional Investor and CBS from Baghdad in 2004. He writes columns for The Korea Times and Future Korea and has reported for The Daily Beast since the 2018 Pyeongchang Winter Olympics and the June 2018 Singapore summit between President Donald Trump and North Korea’s Kim Jong-un.

== Education ==
Kirk holds a bachelor's degree from Princeton, a master's in international relations from the University of Chicago and an honorary doctorate from the University of Maryland Global Campus. He was a Fulbright scholar, New Delhi, 1962–1963; a Ford fellow in Columbia University's advanced international reporting program, 1964–1965; Edward R. Murrow fellow, the Council on Foreign Relations, 1974–1975, visiting fellow, Cornell's Southeast Asia program, 1986-1988; Fulbright senior research scholar, Manila, 1994–1995, Abe fellow, Social Science Research Council, Japan and Korea, 2012; Fulbright-Nehru senior scholar, New Delhi, 2013.

== Awards ==
Kirk won the Overseas Press Club of America Award, 1974, Asia reporting, for articles in the Chicago Tribune on the grim future for South Vietnam after the signing of the Paris Peace Agreement in 1973; the George Polk Award, foreign reporting, 1975, for exposing corruption in Vietnam and Cambodia; the Chicago Tribune’s Edward Scott Beck award, 1974; three Overseas Press Club citations, and the Chicago Newspaper Guild Page-One Award, feature-writing, 1962.

== Professional organizations ==
Kirk is a Silver Owl member of the National Press Club, Washington, a life member of the Foreign Correspondents’ Club of Hong Kong, a fellow of the Institute for Corean-American Studies, and served six terms on the board of the Seoul Foreign Correspondents’ Club. He also belongs to the Overseas Press Club of America, International House of Japan, the Authors Guild of America, the Society of Professional Journalists and the American Society of Journalists and Authors.

== Books ==
- Kim Dae Jung Shinwha (The Legend of Kim Dae Jung), 2010 (Boogle Books (Korean: 부글 북스), Seoul), ISBN 978-89-92307-42-0, OCLC 611198557.
- Korea Betrayed: Kim Dae Jung and Sunshine, 2009 (Palgrave Macmillan, New York, UK), ISBN 978-0-230-62048-3.
- Jakten Pa Nobels Fredsris (The Search for the Nobel Peace Prize), with Kim Kisam, 2016 (Spartacus, Oslo), ISBN 978-82-430-1061-1.
- Encyclopedia of Human Rights, entries on North Korea, South Korea, Kim Dae Jung, 2009 (Oxford, New York), ISBN 978-0-19-533402-9.
- Korea Witness: 135 Years of War, Crisis and News in the Land of the Morning Calm, co-editor with Choe Sang-hun, 2006 (EunHaeng NaMu, Seoul), ISBN 978-89-5660-155-7.
- Korean Crisis: Unraveling of the Miracle in the IMF Era, 2000, paperback 2002 (St. Martin's, NY, Macmillan UK), ISBN 978-0-312-23999-2.
- Philippines in Crisis: U.S. Power versus Local Revolt, 2006 (Anvil, Manila), ISBN 978-971-27-1726-0.
- Looted: The Philippines After the Bases, 1998, paperback, 2000 (St. Martin's, NY, Macmillan UK), ISBN 978-0-312-22769-2, 978-0-312-17423-1.
- Business Guide to the Philippines, general editor, 1996 (Butterworth-Heinemann, Singapore, 1998, ISBN 978-981-00-7081-6; 2012 (Routledge, London).
- Tell it to the Dead: Stories of a War, foreword by Arthur Dommen, 1996 (M.E. Sharpe, Armonk NY) ISBN 978-1-56324-718-7; 2016 (Routledge, London).
- Korean Dynasty: Hyundai and Chung Ju Yung, 1994 (M.E. Sharpe, Armonk, and Asia2000, Hong Kong), ISBN 978-1-56324-425-4; 2016 (Routledge, London).
- Tell it to the Dead: Memories of a War, 1975 (Nelson-Hall, Burnham, Chicago), ISBN 978-0-88229-287-8.
- Wider War: The Struggle for Cambodia, Thailand and Laos, 1971 (Praeger, New York, Pall Mall, London), ISBN 978-0-9709728-0-4.

== Sources ==
- Bio, Northeast Asia Editor of the Internet newspaper, World Tribune
- Bio, American Society of Journalists and Authors Member
- Bio, Institute of Corean-American Studies

=== Articles or interviews ===
- “My First Foreign Correspondent,” by Pulitzer Prize winning reporter Choe Sang Hun, “Korea Witness,” pp. 277–280
- Kirk Has 2nd Thoughts on Sunshine Policy,” by JR Breen, Korea Times, November 24, 2009
- Interview, by Charles Duerden, Korea Trade & Investment, journal of the Korea Trade-Investment Promotion Agency, KOTRA, September–October 2003.
- Talk to the Editor for May 27, Tension in Korea, interview by Christian Science Monitor Editor John Yemma and Pat Murphy, May 27, 2010
- CAMBODIAN WAR: 1970 -1975 A First and Last Reunion of a Unique Band of Brothers & Sisters, Cambodia News (CAMNEWS)
- KBS World, Seoul Report, Matt Kelley Interviews Don Kirk
