= The Powers That Be (book) =

1979 book by David Halberstam

- First edition
- Author: David Halberstam
- Language: English
- Subject: American media
- Published: 1979 (Alfred A. Knopf)
- Publication place: United States
- Media type: Print (hardcover and paperback)
- Pages: 771
- ISBN: 0394503813
- OCLC: 04641874

The Powers That Be is a 1979 book by David Halberstam about the American media.

== Summary ==
The book focuses on the following American media companies: CBS, the Los Angeles Times, The Washington Post, and Time.

== Critical reception ==
The Globe and Mail wrote: "The trouble is that the Halberstam of Vietnam, and of The Best and the Brightest, has become David Halberstam: institution, and like others who take themselves too seriously, his prose suffers."
