= The Coldest Winter: America and the Korean War =

2007 history book by David Halberstam

- Author: David Halberstam
- Language: English
- Subject: Korean War, 1950–1953 – United States
- Genre: History
- Published: September 25, 2007 (Hyperion Books, New York)
- Publication place: United States
- Media type: Print (hardcover)
- Pages: xi, 719 pp (first edition)
- ISBN: 1401300529
- OCLC: 137324872
- Dewey Decimal: 951.904/240973
- LC Class: DS919 .H35 2007

The Coldest Winter: America and the Korean War is a non-fiction book by the author David Halberstam. It was published posthumously in 2007, after his sudden death in a traffic collision at the age of 73.

The book was a finalist for the Pulitzer Prize for History in 2008.

== Subject ==
The book, written more than half a century after the Korean War, looks at the war from a different perspective than previously written works on the war by various authors.

Quotes pay homage to an earlier Korean War author T. R. Fehrenbach, and The Coldest Winter mentions Fehrenbach's combat experience, something that Fehrenbach never mentions for himself in his seminal work, This Kind of War.

== Reception ==
Charles J. Hanley, in a 2017 review of a different book, was critical of the lack of attention paid to civilian casualties in The Coldest Winter.
