= Elizabeth Hirschboeck =

Personal life
- Born: 10 March 1903 Milwaukee, Wisconsin
- Died: 20 September 1986 (aged 83) New York, New York
- Education: Marquette University

Religious life
- Religion: Roman Catholic
- Order: Maryknoll Sisters of St. Dominic
- Profession: Humanitarian

Elizabeth Hirschboeck (March 10, 1903 – September 20, 1986), also known as Sister Mary Mercy, was a religious sister of the Maryknoll Sisters of St. Dominic and an international humanitarian.

== Early life and education ==
On December 2, 1922, while a student at Marquette University, Hirschboeck survived a serious automobile accident. She was convinced that God spared her life so she could consecrate it more fully to him. She expressed her desire to join the Maryknoll Sisters at that time; however, Mother Mary Joseph encouraged her to first complete her medical studies.

- She and her two brothers attended SS. Peter and Paul Grammar School and St. John's Cathedral High School.
- In December 1922, when she was 19, Hirschboeck was traveling with her friend in a car driven by the friend's father. There was an accident, and the friend died.
- She became physician and in 1931 she began practicing in Korea.
