= David Halberstam =

American writer, journalist and historian (1934–2007)

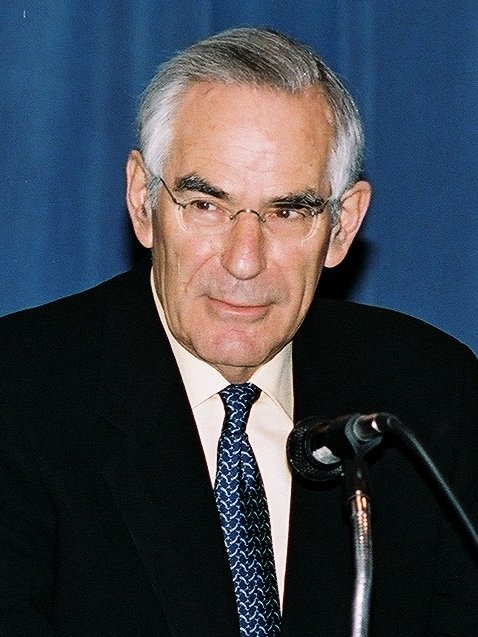
- Halberstam in 2001
- Born: April 10, 1934; New York City, U.S.
- Died: April 23, 2007 (aged 73); Menlo Park, California, U.S.
- Education: Harvard University (AB)
- Occupations: Journalist; historian; writer
- Spouses: Elżbieta Czyżewska (m. 1965; div. 1977) Jean Sandness Butler (m. 1979)
- Children: 1
- Relatives: Michael J. Halberstam (brother)
- Writing career
- Genre: Non-fiction

David Halberstam (April 10, 1934 – April 23, 2007) was an American writer, journalist, and historian, known for his work on the Vietnam War, politics, history, the civil rights movement, business, media, American culture, Korean War, and later, sports journalism. He won a Pulitzer Prize for International Reporting in 1964. Halberstam was killed in a car crash in 2007 while doing research for a book.

== Early life and education ==
Halberstam was born in New York City, the son of Blanche (née Levy) and Charles A. Halberstam, schoolteacher and Army surgeon. His family was Jewish. He was raised in Winsted, Connecticut, where he was a classmate of Ralph Nader. Halberstam moved to Yonkers, New York, and graduated from Roosevelt High School in 1951. In 1955, he graduated from Harvard College with an A.B. degree after serving as managing editor of The Harvard Crimson. Halberstam had a rebellious streak and as editor of the Harvard Crimson engaged in a competition to see which columnist could most offend readers.

== Career ==
Halberstam's journalism career began at the Daily Times Leader in West Point, Mississippi. He covered the beginnings of the civil rights movement for The Tennessean in Nashville. John Lewis later stated that Halberstam was the only journalist in Nashville who would cover the Nashville sit-ins, organized by the Nashville Student Movement which Halberstam focused on in his 1998 book The Children. Halberstam's fiery, rebellious streak first came out when covering the civil rights movement as he protested against the lies of the authorities who portrayed the civil rights protesters as violent and dangerous.

=== Republic of the Congo ===
In August 1961, The New York Times dispatched Halberstam to the Republic of the Congo to report on the Congo Crisis. Although initially eager to cover the events in the country, over time he grew jaded over the demanding working conditions and the difficulty in handling Congolese officials' lack of truthfulness. In July 1962 he quickly accepted an opportunity to move to Vietnam to report on the Vietnam War for The New York Times.

=== Vietnam ===
Halberstam arrived in Vietnam in the middle of 1962. A tall and well built man, he conveyed much self-confidence and initially the American embassy approved of him. However, Halberstam was openly hostile to any hint of deception, and he soon came into conflict with American officials. When the chief American officer in South Vietnam, General Paul D. Harkins, launched an operation with 45 helicopters flown by American pilots landing a battalion of South Vietnamese infantry to attack a Viet Cong base, Halberstam was forbidden from doing any direct reporting; he was simply told to report the operation as a victory. Halberstam was enraged by this media control, as he expressed in a letter to Frederick Nolting, the Ambassador to South Vietnam. Halberstam wrote about the media blackout: "The reason given is security. This is, of course, stupid, naive and indeed insulting to the patriotism and intelligence of every American newspaperman, and every American newspaper represented here." Halberstam argued that the operation could not have been the victory that Harkins had claimed as the Viet Cong must have heard the helicopters coming and accordingly retreated as guerrillas normally do when faced with superior force, leading him to write: "You can bet the V.C. knew what was happening. You can bet Hanoi knew what was happening. Only American reporters and American readers were kept ignorant."

With the help of military sources like John Paul Vann, an active duty officer in Military Assistance Command, Vietnam (MACV), Halberstam, along with colleagues Neil Sheehan of UPI and Malcolm Browne of the AP, challenged the upbeat reporting of the United States mission in South Vietnam. They reported the defeat of government troops at the first major battle of the Vietnam War known as the Battle of Ap Bac. Historian Mark Moyar has charged that Vann presented Halberstam with a one-sided narrative of the events that omitted his own malfeasance in the Battle of Ap Bac. President John F. Kennedy tried to get The New York Times to replace Halberstam with a more compliant journalist. The Times refused.

During the Buddhist crisis in 1963, Halberstam and Neil Sheehan debunked the claim by the Diệm regime that the Army of the Republic of Vietnam regular forces had perpetrated the brutal raids on Buddhist temples, which the American authorities had initially believed, but that the Special Forces, loyal to Diệm's brother and strategist Nhu, had done so to frame the army generals. However, this claim proved to be false. On August 18, 1963, ten of the South Vietnamese Army's most senior generals, which included Buddhists and Catholics, met to discuss the crises involving the Buddhist protests. They concluded that the protests had gone on too long and presented a clear danger to the war effort against the communists and that communists had ingrained themselves amongst the Buddhist protest movement. He was also involved in a scuffle with Nhu's secret police after they punched fellow journalist Peter Arnett while the news men were covering a Buddhist protest. Seeing Arnett lying on the ground being punched and kicked by policemen, Halberstam ran to his rescue, shouting in fury: "Go back, get back you sons of bitches or I'll beat the shit out of you!" As Halberstam spoke in English, the policemen did not understand him, but as he was much taller than the diminutive Vietnamese, the sight of him running at them, red-faced and furious, was enough to cause them to run away.

Halberstam's reporting led to a feud with journalists Marguerite Higgins and Joseph Alsop, and TIME Magazine publisher Henry Luce, who all championed the Diem regime. All three had been members of the "China Lobby", who had been, in the 1930s and 1940s, passionately committed to supporting the Kuomintang regime and believed that the only reason the Kuomintang lost the Chinese Civil War in 1949 was because a few American officials and journalists had chosen to "betray" Chiang Kai-shek, who otherwise would have defeated the Communists. Reporters like Theodore White, who saw and exposed Chiang's corruption and indifference to China's peasants, were – to the China Lobby – defeatists and traitors. (White's insistence on covering the Chiang regime as he saw it would eventually destroy his relationship with Luce, who had been his patron and a close friend.)

The China Lobby tended to approve of Diem for the same reasons that they approved of Chiang, seeing both as pro-Western, modernizing Christian leaders who made their respective nations into copies of the United States. In the same way the China Lobby portrayed Chiang as China's Christian savior because of his conversion to Methodism, and as someone who would presumably convert the rest of the Chinese to Christianity, they saw the Catholic Diem as Vietnam's Christian savior who likewise would convert the Vietnamese to Christianity. Both Higgins and Luce had been born in China to Protestant missionary parents and were very attracted to the idea of one day converting all of the Chinese to Christianity; Chiang's defeat in 1949 had caused them much bitterness. For many members of the China Lobby, South Vietnam was a sort of consolation prize for the "loss of China" in 1949. Halberstam's criticism of Diem sounded very similar to American journalists' criticism of Chiang in the 1940s, and it threatened the possibility of "losing" South Vietnam. This led to their furious attacks on Halberstam.

Before going to South Vietnam, Higgins was briefed by Marine General, Victor "Brute" Krulak, about what line she was to take. In her first column from Saigon, Higgins called the younger American journalists like Halberstam and Sheenan, "typewriter strategists" who rarely went into battle, further adding: "Reporters here would like to see us lose the war to prove they're right." In response to editors of The New York Times who told Halberstam to change his coverage to gain Higgins's approval, he wrote back: "If you mention that woman's name to me one more time I will resign, repeat resign, and I mean it, repeat, mean it." More dangerous to Halberstam was criticism of Alsop owing to his friendship with the Kennedy brothers. In his columns, Alsop, without naming Halberstam explicitly, mentioned a young reporter from The New York Times who was a "defeatist" who never reported the good news from "Vietnam's fighting front." Halberstam ridiculed Alsop's statement about the "fighting front" as reflecting the ignorance of someone who did not understand guerrilla warfare, where there was no "front" in the sense that Alsop had used the word.

In Halberstam's view, Higgins and Alsop weren't doing any reporting on the ground, they were merely flying into Saigon occasionally to interview US officials and transmit those comments to their American readers. In effect, Halberstam wrote, Higgins and Alsop came to Vietnam "not so much to report on the war as to strengthen policy." Halberstam saw the official, optimistic view of the war as inaccurate – and therefore fundamentally dishonest: "Among lower- and middle-ranking American and Vietnamese officials, there was the working level view," he wrote in his book, The Powers That Be. "It was a view shared by the American reporters. They could see what was really going on, and they refused, in their reporting, to fake it.... The American government was fighting less a war than a public relations campaign."

Halberstam tried to visit North Vietnam. Halberstam asked Mieczysław Maneli, the Polish Commissioner to the International Control Commission, if he would be able to arrange for him to visit North Vietnam. However, Maneli had to tell him that the message from Premier Phạm Văn Đồng was that "We are not interested in building up the prestige of American journalists". Maneli suspected the real reason for refusing Halberstam permission to enter North Vietnam was the belief by the North Vietnamese that he might be an American spy.

Halberstam received the George Polk Award for Foreign Reporting for his 1963 reporting for The New York Times on Vietnam and the Vietnam War.

Halberstam left Vietnam in 1964, at age 30, and was awarded the Pulitzer Prize for International Reporting that year. In 1965 he published a book The Making of a Quagmire based on his reporting from Vietnam in 1962 and 1963. At this point he was still a hawk, a strong supporter of the anti-Communist war effort in Vietnam. He wrote, "A strategic country in a key area, [Vietnam] is perhaps one of only five or six nations in the world that is truly vital to U.S. interests." "We would dishonor ourselves and our allies by pulling out" By the time he published The Best and the Brightest in 1972, a much broader study of U.S. policy toward Vietnam, he was less supportive of the war.

He was interviewed in the 1968 documentary film on the Vietnam War, titled In the Year of the Pig.

=== Civil rights movement and Poland ===
In the mid-1960s, Halberstam covered the civil rights movement for The New York Times. He was sent on assignment to Poland, where he soon became "an attraction from behind the Iron Curtain" to the artistic boheme in Warsaw. The result of that fascination was a 12-year marriage to one of the most popular young actresses of that time, Elżbieta Czyżewska, on June 13, 1965.

Initially well received by the communist regime, two years later he was expelled from the country as persona non grata for publishing an article in The New York Times criticizing the Polish government. Czyżewska followed him, becoming an outcast herself; that decision disrupted her career in the country where she was a big star, adored by millions. In the spring of 1967, Halberstam traveled with Martin Luther King Jr. from New York City to Cleveland and then to Berkeley, California for a Harper's article, "The Second Coming of Martin Luther King".

=== Foreign policy, media works ===
Halberstam next wrote about President John F. Kennedy's foreign-policy decisions on the Vietnam War in The Best and the Brightest. In 1972 Halberstam went to work on his next book, The Powers That Be, published in 1979 and featuring profiles of media titans like William S. Paley of CBS, Henry Luce of Time magazine, and Phil Graham of The Washington Post.

In 1980 his brother, cardiologist Michael J. Halberstam, was shot and killed during a home invasion by escaped convict and prolific burglar Bernard C. Welch Jr. His only public comment related to his brother's murder came when he and Michael's widow castigated Life magazine, then published monthly, for paying Michael's killer $9,000 to pose in jail for color photographs that appeared on inside pages of the February 1981 edition of Life.

In 1991 Halberstam wrote The Next Century, in which he argued that, after the end of the Cold War, the United States was likely to fall behind economically to other countries such as Japan and Germany.

=== Sportswriting ===
Later in his career, Halberstam turned to sports, publishing The Breaks of the Game, an inside look at Bill Walton and the 1979–80 Portland Trail Blazers basketball team; Summer of '49, on the baseball pennant race battle between the New York Yankees and Boston Red Sox; October 1964, on the 1964 World Series between the New York Yankees and St. Louis Cardinals; Playing for Keeps, an ambitious book on Michael Jordan in 1999; The Teammates: A Portrait of a Friendship, focusing on the relationships among several members of the Boston Red Sox in the 1940s; and The Education of a Coach, about New England Patriots head coach Bill Belichick. Much of his sportswriting, particularly his baseball books, focuses on the personalities of the players and the times they lived in as much as on the games themselves.

In particular, Halberstam depicted the 1949 Yankees and Red Sox as symbols of a nobler era, when blue-collar athletes modestly strove to succeed and enter the middle class rather than making millions and defying their owners and talking back to the press. In 1997, Halberstam received the Elijah Parish Lovejoy Award as well as an honorary Doctor of Laws degree from Colby College.

=== Later years ===
After publishing four books in the 1960s, including the novel The Noblest Roman, The Making of a Quagmire and The Unfinished Odyssey of Robert Kennedy, he wrote three books in the 1970s, four books in the 1980s, and six books in the 1990s including his 1998 The Children which chronicled the 1959–1962 Nashville Student Movement. He wrote four more books in the 2000s, and was working on at least two others at the time of his death.

In the wake of the September 11 attacks, Halberstam wrote the book Firehouse about the lives of the men from Engine 40, Ladder 35 of the New York City Fire Department. The last book Halberstam completed, The Coldest Winter: America and the Korean War, was published posthumously in September 2007.

== Death ==
Halberstam died in a traffic collision on April 23, 2007, in Menlo Park, California, at the age of 73. He was en route to an interview with former San Francisco 49ers and New York Giants quarterback Y. A. Tittle for a book about the 1958 championship game between the Giants and the Baltimore Colts, when the journalism student driving Halberstam to the interview illegally turned into oncoming traffic.

After Halberstam's death, the book project was taken over by Frank Gifford, who had played for the losing New York Giants in the 1958 game, and was titled The Glory Game, published by HarperCollins in October 2008 with an introduction dedicated to Halberstam.

== Mentor to other authors ==
Howard Bryant in the acknowledgments section of Juicing the Game, his 2005 book about steroids in baseball, said of Halberstam's assistance: "He provided me with a succinct road map and the proper mind-set." Bryant went on to quote Halberstam on how to tackle a controversial non-fiction subject: "Think about three or four moments that you believe to be the most important during your time frame. Then think about what the leadership did about it. It doesn't have to be complicated. What happened, and what did the leaders do about it? That's your book."

== Criticism ==
Pulitzer Prize-winning Korean War correspondent Marguerite Higgins was pro-Diệm and frequently clashed with Halberstam and his colleagues. She claimed they had ulterior motives, saying "reporters here would like to see us lose the war to prove they're right."

In the Vietnam conflict, Halberstam's reporting for The New York Times led many, including Times editors, to believe that Buddhists were a majority of the Vietnamese population and that the Diệm administration was therefore a minority suppressing a majority. In fact, only 30% of Vietnamese were practicing Buddhists at the time. "The myth of the gravity of the Buddhist crisis was also a point of contention." Halberstam's reporting made the crisis seem much more mainstream than it was.

Historian Mark Moyar claimed that Halberstam, along with fellow journalists Neil Sheehan and Stanley Karnow, helped to bring about the 1963 South Vietnamese coup against President Diệm by sending negative information on Diệm to the U.S. government in news articles and in private, all because they decided Diệm was unhelpful in the war effort. Moyar claims that much of this information was false or misleading. Moyar argues that Halberstram and Karnow relied too heavily on Pham Ngoc Thao and Pham Xuan An as sources: both men were undercover communist spies assigned to mislead journalists.

Newspaper opinion editor Michael Young posits that Halberstam saw Vietnam as a moral tragedy, with America's hubris bringing about its downfall. Young writes that Halberstam reduced everything to human will, turning his subjects into agents of broader historical forces and coming off like a Hollywood movie with a fated and formulaic climax.

== Awards and honors ==
- 2009: Norman Mailer Prize, Distinguished Journalism
- 1994: Golden Plate Award of the American Academy of Achievement presented by Awards Council member Neil Sheehan
- 1964: Pulitzer Prize for International Reporting, Malcolm W. Browne and Halberstam

== Books ==
External videos
- Interview with Halberstam on The Reckoning, October 1, 1987, C-SPAN
- Booknotes interview with Halberstam on The Fifties, July 11, 1993, C-SPAN
- Discussion at Fisk University with Halberstam and panelists who were profiled in The Children, March 26, 1998, C-SPAN
- Discussion with Halberstam on Playing for Keeps: Michael Jordan and the World He Made, February 22, 1999, C-SPAN
- Discussion with Halberstam on War in a Time of Peace, October 7, 2001, C-SPAN
- Halberstam interviewed by Ben Bradlee on the influence of The Best and the Brightest, February 13, 2005, C-SPAN

- The Noblest Roman. Boston: Houghton-Mifflin. 1961. OCLC 871147. (novel)
- The Making of a Quagmire. Random House. 1965.
- The Making of a Quagmire: America and Vietnam During the Kennedy Era revised edition. Knopf, McGraw-Hill. 1988. ISBN 0-07-555092-X.
- One Very Hot Day. Boston: Houghton-Mifflin. 1967. ASIN B000HFUAT4. (novel)
- The Unfinished Odyssey of Robert Kennedy. Random House. 1968. ISBN 0-394-45025-6.
- Ho. McGraw-Hill. 1971. ISBN 0-07-554223-4.
- The Best and the Brightest. Ballantine Books. 1972. ISBN 0-449-90870-4.
- The Powers That Be. Alfred A. Knopf. 1979. ISBN 0-252-06941-2.
- The Breaks of the Game. Ballantine Books. 1981. ISBN 0-345-29625-7.
- The Amateurs: The Story of Four Young Men and Their Quest for an Olympic Gold Medal. Ballantine Books. 1985. ISBN 0-449-91003-2. — about the sport of rowing
- The Reckoning. Avon Books. 1986. ISBN 0-380-72147-3.
- Summer of '49: The Yankees and the Red Sox in Postwar America. New York: William Morrow & Co. 1989. ISBN 0-688-06678-X.
- The Next Century. Random House. 1991. ISBN 0-517-09882-2.
- The Fifties. Ballantine Books. 1993. ISBN 0-449-90933-6.
- October 1964. Ballantine Books. 1994. ISBN 0-449-98367-6.
- The Children. Ballantine Books. 1998. ISBN 0-449-00439-2.
- Playing for Keeps: Michael Jordan and the World He Made. Broadway Books. 1999. ISBN 0-7679-0444-3.
- War in a Time of Peace: Bush, Clinton, and the Generals. Scribner. 2001. ISBN 0-7432-2323-3.
- Firehouse. Hachette. 2002. ISBN 0-7868-8851-2.
- The Teammates: A Portrait of a Friendship. Hyperion. 2003. ISBN 0-7868-8867-9.
- The Education of a Coach. Hyperion. 2005. ISBN 1-4013-0879-1.
- The Coldest Winter: America and the Korean War. Hyperion. 2007. ISBN 978-1-4013-0052-4.
- The Glory Game: How the 1958 NFL Championship Changed Football Forever. HarperCollins. 2008. ISBN 978-0-06-154255-8. — in progress at Halberstam's death; completed by Frank Gifford

== See also ==
- Thích Quảng Đức
- Harrison Salisbury
- Double Seven Day scuffle

== Works cited ==
- Seyb, Ronald P. (2017). "Young Man and War: David Halberstam's Empathetic Reporting during the Congo Crisis". Journalism History. 43 (2): 75–85. doi:10.1080/00947679.2017.12059168. ISSN 0094-7679. S2CID 150008826.
- Langguth, A.J. (2000). Our Vietnam: The War 1954–1975. Simon and Schuster. ISBN 0-7432-1231-2.
