= Charles J. Hanley =

American journalist and author (born 1947)

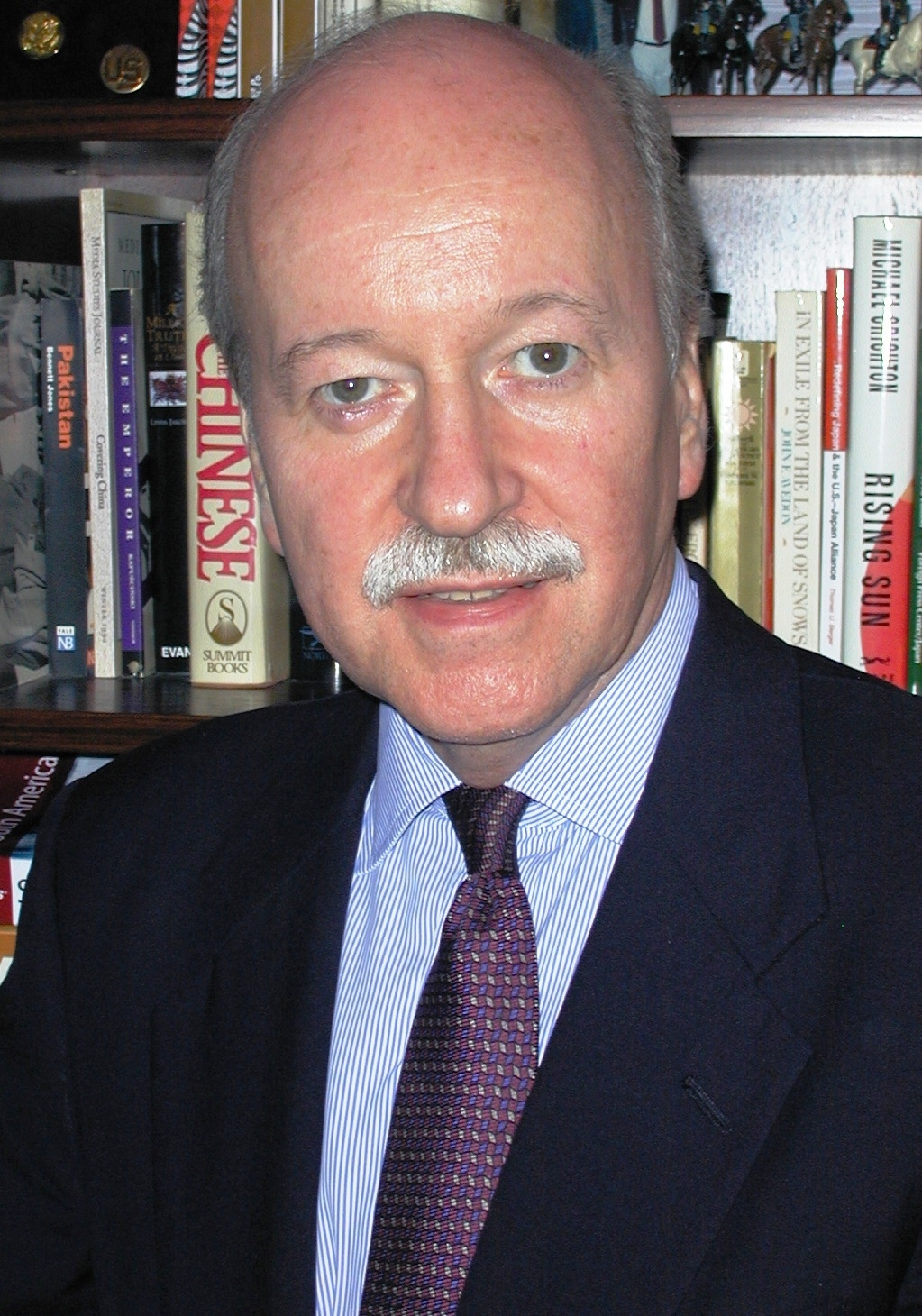
- Hanley in 2007
- Born: July 6, 1947 (age 79); Brooklyn, New York
- Education: St. Bonaventure University
- Occupation: Journalist
- Employer: Associated Press
- Notable work: • The Bridge at No Gun Ri • Ghost Flames
- Title: Special Correspondent
- Spouse: Pamela Hanlon

Charles J. Hanley is an American journalist and author who reported for the Associated Press (AP) for over 40 years, chiefly as a roving international correspondent. In 2000, he and two AP colleagues won the Pulitzer Prize for Investigative Reporting for their work confirming the U.S. military’s massacre of South Korean refugees at No Gun Ri during the Korean War.

== Early life ==
Hanley graduated from St. Bonaventure University in 1968 with a journalism degree. In 1969–1970, he served as a U.S. Army journalist, including in wartime Vietnam.

== Journalism career ==
Hanley joined the AP's Albany, New York bureau in 1968, returning there in 1971 after military service. In 1976, he transferred to the AP's international news desk in New York where he eventually became a roving international correspondent, reporting on subjects ranging from wars and summit conferences to climate change in the Arctic. In 1987–1992, he served as AP assistant and deputy managing editor.

=== No Gun Ri ===
In 1998, Hanley and reporters Choe Sang-hun and Martha Mendoza, assisted by researcher Randy Herschaft, confirmed that the U.S. military massacred South Korean refugees – an estimated 250-300, the South Korean government later concluded – near No Gun Ri, South Korea, in late July 1950. The AP team had located a dozen U.S. Army veterans, witnesses, who corroborated the account of Korean survivors. The reporters also uncovered declassified archival U.S. military documents ordering the shooting of civilians, out of fear of enemy infiltrators.

The story was not published until September 1999, after a year-long struggle with an AP leadership reluctant to run such an explosive report. The AP team subsequently won 11 major journalism awards, including the Pulitzer and a Polk Award.

=== Iraq reporting ===
In the years after the 9/11 terror attacks, Hanley reported extensively on the conflicts in Afghanistan and Iraq. Before the 2003 U.S. invasion, he reported from Iraq on the lack of evidence of weapons of mass destruction in that country, discrediting official U.S. claims. He was the first journalist to report on the prisoner abuses at Abu Ghraib and other U.S. prisons in Iraq, months before photos emerging from Abu Ghraib drew international attention to the story.

== Awards ==
In addition to the honors for the No Gun Ri reporting, Hanley’s other journalism won awards from the Overseas Press Club, the Associated Press Managing Editors association, Brown University’s Feinstein media awards program, the Korn Ferry awards for reporting on the United Nations, and the Society of Environmental Journalists.

== Books ==
In 2001, Henry Holt and Company published The Bridge at No Gun Ri, a narrative recounting of the 1950 massacre and events before and after, written by Hanley with the reporting assistance of his AP partners.

In August 2020, PublicAffairs, an imprint of Perseus Books Group, published Hanley's Ghost Flames: Life and Death in a Hidden War, Korea 1950–1953, a narrative history of the entire Korean War, told through the experiences of 20 individuals who lived through it, civilians and soldiers of several nationalities involved. An underlying theme is the little-known "dark underside" of wartime atrocities.

Earlier in his career, Hanley co-authored World War II: A 50th Anniversary History (Henry Holt); 20th Century America (Grolier Educational), and FLASH! The Associated Press Covers the World (Abrams).
