= Kim Ji-hyun (actress) =

South Korean actress (born 1982)

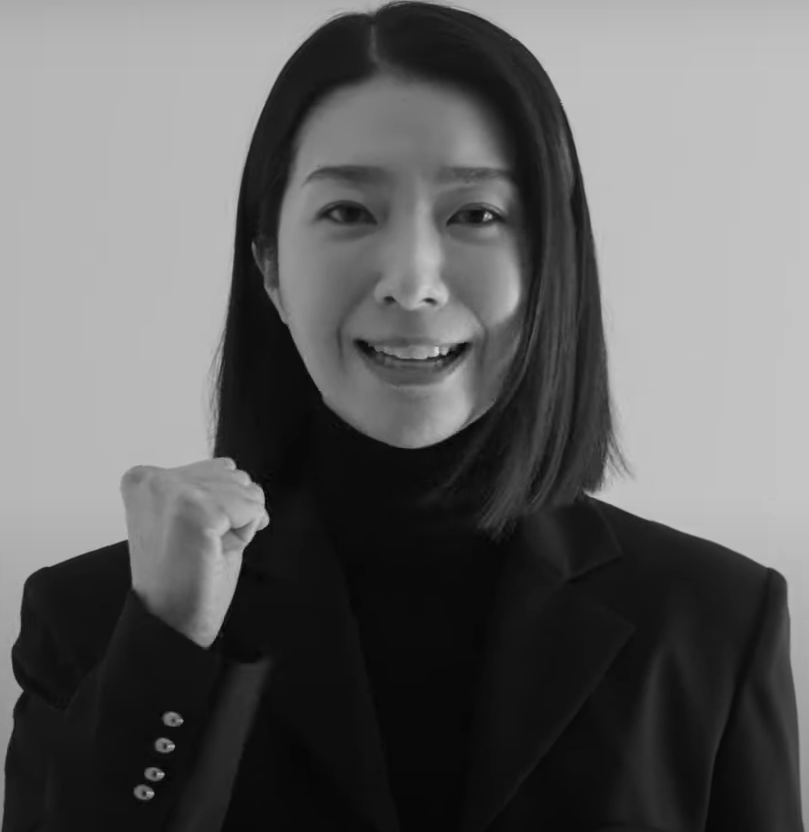
- Kim for Marie Clarie Korea in March 2022
- Born: January 2, 1982 (age 44); South Korea
- Education: Korea National University of Arts (Department of Acting)
- Occupations: Actress; theater actor; musical actor
- Years active: 2006–present
- Agent: Vibe Actors

Korean name
- Hangul: 김지현
- Hanja: 金志炫
- RR: Gim Jihyeon
- MR: Kim Chihyŏn
- Website: vibeactors.com/kimjihyun

Kim Ji-hyun (Korean: 김지현; born January 2, 1982) is a South Korean actress. Kim is known for her roles in The Smile Has Left Your Eyes (2018), Justice (2019), and Thirty-Nine, as well as for her performances in films like Solace (2006) and A Little Pond (2009). She is currently affiliated with the artist management company Vibe Actors.

She holds both a bachelor's and a master's degree in acting from Korea National University of Arts. Kim made her acting debut in 2006 and has since appeared in various musical plays, films, and television series. Following her graduation, she participated in several productions with Yi Sang-woo, including plays such as Korea Fantasy (2005), Byun (2005), and The Story of Yangdeokwon (2010) under the Chaimu Theater Company.

== Early life and education ==
Kim Ji-hyun was born on January 2, 1982. In her youth, she did not have a specific career aspiration, occasionally mentioning interests in science or teaching when asked. Her perspective on her future changed after enrolling at Ulsan Girls' High School. Influenced by her older sister, who was already in college, Kim began to consider her future major.

During her first year, she befriended a classmate with theater club experience from middle school. Together, they proposed starting a theater club, which was successfully launched with the support of a teacher. Although some teachers opposed her involvement due to her academic achievements, the club's victory at a theater festival in Ulsan established it as the official theater club of Ulsan Girls' High School. This experience ignited Kim's passion for acting, leading her to pursue it as a career.

In 2000, Kim enrolled in the Department of Acting at Korea National University of Arts. During her studies, she joined the university's theater club, Dolgochi. (Note: Dolgochi (Korean: 극단 돌곶이; RR: Geukdan dolgoji; lit. 'Theater Troupe Stone Wall') was established in 2002, Director Kim Gwang-rim by as official theater company of Theater Institute of Korea National University of Arts.) Reflecting on her university experience, Kim described herself as "mediocre," indicating that while she managed to perform adequately and collaborate effectively, she did not excel in any specific area. She noted that her professors emphasized the need for actors to be either exceptional or face failure, suggesting that she lacked intensity.

In her third year, she met Yi Sang-woo, a professor at her university who was also a CEO of Chaimu Theater Company and a renowned playwright in Daehangno.

== Career ==
=== 2004–2006: Beginnings ===
In February 2004, Kim participated in a student graduation workshop at Korea National University of Arts, showcasing her talent in two musicals produced by fellow undergraduate students. The first musical, The Story of Mirror Princess Pyeonggang, created by Min Jun-ho, featured a unique performance by eight actors who remained on stage for the entire 1 hour and 25 minutes, constantly moving without leaving. The actors generated all sound effects and audio elements using only their voices (a cappella). This innovative production received ₩1 million in production support from Korea National University of Arts.

The second musical, Finding Mr. Destiny, was written and directed by Jang Yoo-jung and composed by Kim Hye-seong. With a budget of ₩100,000 (approximately US$87.31), the production starred Kim as the female lead, along with Jeon Byeong-wook as Kim Jong-wook and Min Jun-ho in multiple roles. Their graduation performance at the Black Box Theater of Korea National University of Arts impressed their professors, leading to an official invitation to the 15th Istropolitana Project, an international student theater festival held in Bratislava, Slovakia, from June 26 to June 30, 2004.

"Our troupe has been significantly influenced by Chaimu (Note: Theater Chaimu a company led by director Yi Sang-woo, known for producing numerous famous movie stars).) [...] Hence, we aspire to follow in the footsteps of our seniors. We offer each other support and motivation, continuously engaging in acting to the extent that we never grow weary of it. We possess a strong desire, despite our age, to pursue our passion. This determination is our greatest asset. Mutual respect prevails among us, resulting in significant synergy."

— Kim on Theater Ganda, Newsis Interview

In September 2004, Min Jun-ho established Theater Ganda (Note: Performance Delivery Service - Ganda (공연 배달 서비스-간다) or "Gongyeon Baedal Service-Ganda) was established as Study Group by nine fellow students from Korea National University of Arts, often referred to as "Theater Ganda" (극단 간다). In September 2004, they officially registered "Theater Ganda" (극단 간다) as a theater group called "Pitdeongi" (핏덩이), with the average age of the members being 25 years old. Current members include Kim Ji-hyun, Lee Hee-joon, Jin Seon-kyu, Kim Min-jae, Yang Kyung-won and Oh Eui-shik) as an official theater company, and Kim became one of the founding members, marking the beginning of her career as a musical and theater actress.

In December 2004, Kim reprised her role in Finding Mr. Destiny as a member of Dolgochi. The club performed three original musicals at the Jayu Theater at the Seoul Arts Center: Ssukbuckthorn (December 9–11), The Mirror Princess Pyeonggang Story (December 13–15), and Finding Mr. Destiny (December 17–19).

In 2006, Kim appeared as a supporting actress in Byun Seung-wook's film Solace, portraying the character Mi-ran.

=== 2007–2011: Finding Mr. Destiny and other works ===
In 2007, Kim reunited with writer Jang Yoo-jung and composer Kim Hye-seong for Season 3 of the musical Finding Mr. Destiny. CJ ENM acquired the performance rights after being impressed by their university performance in 2004 and collaborated with Musical Haven for the joint production. The musical originally premiered in 2005 with Oh Na-ra as the female lead. Kim shared role with Oh Na-ra and Ahn Yu-jin, with male lead roles played by Park Dong-ha, Kim Mu-yeol, and Kim Jae-beom. The multiple-man role (18 characters) was portrayed by Lim Ki-hong and Jin Seon-kyu. Directed by Kim Ji-yeon and with music direction by Jeong Jun, the musical began at Daehakro Arts Plaza on October 23.

"Finding Kim Jong-wook was the first piece of work I did during a workshop at school, so I believe I was able to accomplish it because the directing team suggested it for me to re-enact. I am extremely fortunate. Reflecting on my life, I consider myself very lucky. I have encountered numerous wonderful individuals who have contributed to my ability to perform in this direction."

In the same year, Kim collaborated with Min Jun-ho on The Theater's Realistic Ganda Series, which featured two plays at the Star City Art Hall in Daehakro. The first play, Annapurna in My Heart, written by Park Chun-geun and directed by Min Jun-ho, explored the significance of family. It was created by the playwright group 'Dog' from Korea National University of Arts and was performed from July 4 to 15. The second play, I Loved That Child, written by Choo Min-ja, took the stage from July 17 to 22. Kim played the role of Mi-young, who is involved in a love story with Jeong-tae. The play received acclaim for its engaging dialogue, dynamic acting, and innovative use of a single 'blackboard' to depict 18 scenes and 10 locations. It won awards for Best Picture, Best Direction, and Best Actress at the Miryang Summer Performing Arts Festival and was selected as an ARCO year-end program piece.

In 2009, Kim appeared in Yi Sang-woo's film A Little Pond, which depicted the massacre of South Korean refugees by American soldiers at No Gun Ri in late July 1950, early in the Korean War. Filming began in August 2006, and post-production ended in March 2009. The film premiered on October 8, 2009, at the 14th Busan International Film Festival in Busan, South Korea. Many cast and crew members donated their services due to the story's controversial nature, which discouraged investors.

In 2010, Kim portrayed Heo Yang-mi, a coffee shop owner caring for her younger brother, in Masan MBC's drama series My Sister March. The drama focused on the Busan—Masan Uprising, commemorating its 50th anniversary, and was the first to address this historical event. The screenplay was written by Kim Woon-kyung, known for works like Moon in Seoul, Aunt Ok, and Seoul Ttukbaegi, and was produced by Kim Yong-geun and directed by Jeon Woo-seok.

Kim also demonstrated her acting skills in musicals, portraying Jung-jeon in Prince Puzzle alongside Jo Hwi, Jeon Mi-do, Tae-hee, Ahn Se-ha, and Kim Dae-hyun. The story centered around a crown prince's disappearance and the subsequent investigation, featuring a love story between suspects Ja-sook and Gu-dong. The musical, with a soundtrack by Hwang Ho-jun, received acclaim and support from the 2009 Creative Factory. It was a collaborative production involving the Running Until Death theater company, Doosan Arts Center, and Ansan Arts Center. Directed by Seo Jae-hyung and written by Han Ah-reum, the musical ran at Doosan Art Center Space 111 from October 19 to November 7, 2010.

=== 2012–2018: A decade with Theater Ganda and other projects ===
In 2012, Kim and Yoon Gong-ju were double-cast in the role of Kim Se-jin, a love-struck and socially awkward barista, in the encore performance of the two-hander musical Caffeine musical Caffeine, directed by Seong Jae-jun. The role of the charming sommelier, Kang Ji-min, was also double-cast, with Jeong Sang-hoon and Park Ho-san alternating in the role. Since its initial premiere in 2008, the musical has been consistently performed. The encore performance took place at the Culture Space EnU from February 2 to April 8.

In 2013, Kim had a busy year with two major musicals: Pungwolju and Bungee Jumping. She played Queen Jin-seong in the Pungwolju reading performance in 2011 but missed the musical's premiere in 2012 due to a television drama commitment. She later reprised her role as Queen Jin-seong in the Japanese production of Pungwolju at the Amuse Musical Theater in Roppongi, Tokyo, from June 21 to July 21.

In late 2013, Kim returned as Queen Jin-seong in the South Korean encore of Pungwolju at Dongsung Arts Center's Dongsung Hall from November 9, 2013, to February 16, 2014. She shared the emotional challenges of portraying characters with similar sadness, noting the unresolved aspects of Queen Jin-seong's character mixed with the emotions of her role as Tae-hee in Bungee Jumping. Despite her previous experience, she expressed a desire for more rehearsal time due to changes in the second encore.

In 2014, Kim actively participated in various stage productions. During the summer, she played Natasha, a nightclub dancer, in David Greig's play The Cosmonaut's Last Message to the Woman He Once Loved in the Former Soviet Union. Directed by Lee Sang-woo, the play premiered at the Myeongdong Arts Theater in Seoul, running from May 16 to June 11. The production featured a total of 13 characters, with some actors playing dual roles, including Choi Deok-moon as Ian and Bernard, Lee Hee-joon as Eric and the bar owner, Kim So-jin as Vivian and Sylvia, Lee Chang-soo as Oleg and the patient, Sang Sang-ah as Claire and the airport cafe owner, and Hong Jin-il as Casimir and the bar owner.

"I am more focused because the two eras are together. Also, it is not something I commonly know and encounter, and since it is a premiere, I am adjusting various parts. I will probably continue until the performance starts. Wouldn't it be fierce?"

— Kim on Sylvia of The Pride (2014), My Daily Interview

In August, Kim reunited with Kim So-jin in the South Korean adaptation of Alexi Kaye Campbell's The Pride as Sylvia. Directed by Kim Dong-yeon and written by Ji Yi-seon, the play premiered at the Art One Theater as part of Season 5 of the Best Play Festival. (Note: The Best Play or Yeongeukjeon Co., Ltd. is a specialized corporation established in November 2007 for the systematic operation of Theatrical Jeoljeon based on the performance of Theatrical Jeoljeon in 2004 to revitalize Korean theater. Every two years since 2008, The Theater of the Stars 2, new plays are performed with an annual lineup, and repertoire performances are performed in years other than this season. The Best Play provides high-quality works to the audience through 'discovery of the repertoire of Korean plays', 'support for domestic creative works', 'development of verified overseas works', and 'active exchange with overseas productions' to provide the audience with the fun and charm of plays. I want to share with more people.) The production explored the struggles of marginalized individuals, particularly sexual minorities, through a captivating narrative that alternated between the eras of 1958 and 2014. Lee Myeong-haeng and Jung Sang-yoon were double-cast as Philip; Oh Jong-hyuk and Park Eun-seok played the role of Oliver; and Choi Dae-hoon and Kim Jong-goo were double-cast as Peter.

In October, Kim starred in the musical The Days at the Daehakro Musical Center Grand Theater. The story, set in 1992 and 2012, revolves around the disappearance of the president's daughter and her bodyguard, triggering memories for a security chief who recalls a similar case from 20 years ago. The musical ran from Oct 21 to January 18, 2015.

Kim and Kwak Sun-young shared dual roles Hiroko and Itsuki Fujii in the musical Love Letter, based on a Japanese film with the same name. The story follows Hiroko's journey after losing her fiancé Itsuki in a tragic accident. During his memorial ceremony, Hiroko discovers an address in his yearbook and begins exchanging letters with a woman named Itsuki Fujii, who looks like her. The male role of Itsuki was played by Cho Sang-woong and Kang Ki-dung. The musical also featured Park Ho-san, Yoon Seok-won, Yoo Joo-hye, Ahn So-yeon, Lee Seo-hwan, and Kang Jeong-im in supporting roles. Love Letter ran from December 2 to February 12.

In 2015, Kim collaborated once again with director Kim Dong-yeon in a production of the play Speaking in Tongues by Australian playwright Andrew Bovell. The director added the subtitle "Confessions of the Lost" to the play. This production, making its Korean premiere, was staged at the Suhyeon Theater in Daehakro, Seoul from May 1 to July 16.

In October 2015, Kim and Kim So-jin reunited as double cast in the play Late Autumn. The play was adapted from the 2011 film of the same name, originally starring Tang Wei as Anna. It tells the story of Anna, a woman imprisoned for murder, who has a special encounter with Hoon during a three-day outing following her mother's death. The performances took place at the Daehakro Art One Theater Hall 1 until November 8.

In 2016, Kim and Yoon Na-moo appeared together for the third time in John Cariani's omnibus play Almost, Maine. They played love interests in the episode "Her Heart," which was set in the fictional town of Almost, Maine. The play ran at Sangmyung Art Hall 1 in Daehakro, Seoul until May 1.

In May 2016, Kim and Yeon Jeong were double-cast in Jethro Compton's play, Capone Trilogy. This omnibus play consisted of three episodes: "Rocky (1923)," "Lucifer (1934)," and "Vindici (1943)," all set in the same room at the Lexington Hotel in Chicago during different years. Kim portrayed various characters in each episode: Lola, a deceitful and sensual showgirl in "Rocky"; Marlene, the wife of Nick who claimed to be the second-in-command of the organization in "Lucifer"; and Lucy, a character who assisted a young police officer in seeking revenge in "Vindici." The performances were held at the Hongik University Daehakro Arts Center Small Theater until September 29.

In October 2016, Kim and Jeong Woon-seon were double-cast as Yu-kyeong in the encore performance of the musical Hi! UFO. The production, directed by Heo Yeon-jeong and Park So-young, was based on the 2004 film of the same name and recognized as an excellent re-performance by the Arts Council of Korea. The show took place at Daehakro Art One Theater Hall 1 from October 5 to October 30. The cast also included Im Chul-soo, Yoon Seong-won, Jung Da-hee, Kim Hyun-jin, Yoo-kyung, and Kim Yoo-jung.

In November 2016, Kim and Bae Hae-sun were double-cast as Siobhan in Simon Stephens's play The Curious Incident of the Dog in the Night-Time, which was based on the novel of the same name by Mark Haddon. Siobhan is a special school teacher and the narrator of the play. The story follows Christopher, a 15-year-old boy with autism, as he investigates the murder of his neighbor's dog and explores a world beyond his own. Yoon Na-moo, Jeon Sung-woo, and Ryeowook portrayed Christopher, while Kim Young-ho and Shim Hyung-tak played his father, Ed. Kim Rosa and Yang So-min portrayed his mother, Judy. The cast also included other talented actors such as Kim Dong-hyun, Hwang Seong-hyun, Han Se-ra, Jo Hanna, Kang Jeong-im, and Kim Jong-cheol. The South Korean premiere took place at the BBCH Hall in Gwanglim Art Center, Apgujeong, Seoul, and ran until February 2017 as part of The 14th Kim Soo-ro's project, directed by Kim Tae-hyung. Also in November 2016, Kim reprised the role of Geunyo in the musical Those Days.

In 2017, Kim was part of Jethro Compton's play Bunker Trilogy, directed by Kim Tae-hyung. This omnibus play consisted of three episodes— "Morgana," "Macbeth," and "Agamemnon"—each exploring the true nature of humanity in times of war. Kim portrayed different characters in each episode: Morgana in the Arthurian Legend-inspired "Morgana," Lily in "Macbeth," and Christine in the intense reimagining of the Ancient Greek Legend, "Agamemnon." The play ran at the Hongik University Daehakro Art Center Small Theater until February 19, 2017.

Kim reunited with director Kim Dong-yeon, and reprised her role as Sylvia in the third encore performance of The Pride. Lee Jin-hee (from 2nd encore) and Lim Kang-hee were also cast in the role. The returning cast members included Lee Myeong-haeng, Jung Sang-yoon (from Premiere), Bae Soo-bin (from 2nd encore), and Seong Doo-seop. The character of Oliver was portrayed by Oh Jong-hyuk (from Premiere), Jeong Dong-hwa, Park Sung-hoon (from 2nd encore), and Chang-ryul. The performance ran from March 21 to July 2, 2017, at the Daehakro Art One Theater Hall 2, Seoul.

In December 2017, Kim was triple-cast as Hye-rin in the musical Hourglass, alongside Jo Joung-eun and Jang Eun-ah. The musical was based on the 1995 SBS drama series Sandglass by Song Ji-na and ran at the Chungmu Art Centre Grand Theatre from December 5 to February 11, 2018. It depicted the friendship and love of the three protagonists amidst the turmoil of modern Korean history.

In March 2018, Kim also reprised her roles in Jethro Compton's play, Capone Trilogy. In June, she returned as Tae-hee in the musical Bungee Jumping of Their Own, double-cast with Lim Kang-hee for the 3rd encore.

=== 2019–present: Major theater productions and rise in popularity ===
In 2019, Kim continued to expand her acting repertoire, taking on diverse roles in stage and musical productions. In March, she and Moon Hye-won shared the role of Yoon Yeo-ok in the musical adaptation of the television series Eyes of Dawn. Directed by Kim Jong-hak and written by Song Ji-na, the adaptation is based on a 10-volume novel by Kim Seong-jong published in 1981. The musical, which premiered in March 2019, maintained the dramatic storyline of the original work while introducing new characters and significant historical events, spanning from the Japanese colonial period to World War II, Korea's liberation and the Korean War.

In August 2019, Kim took on the challenge of portraying nine different characters in the two-hander play adaptation of Jane Austen's Pride and Prejudice. This production required her to memorize and perform a considerable amount of dialogue. Despite her experience, the complexity of the characters, including Elizabeth Bennet, Mrs. Bennet, and Lydia Bennet, proved demanding. She received the script from the Moon Company in August 2018 while concluding her involvement in Bungee Jumping.

While performing in musical Eyes of Dawn, Kim received an offer to audition for Sweeney Todd from OD Company. Despite a busy schedule and a conflicting drama commitment, she submitted a video audition. Producer Shin Chun-soo and director Eric Schaeffer were impressed by her performance and confirmed her casting. Sweeney Todd, which premiered in October 2019, marked Kim's first major licensed musical, representing a significant departure from her previous roles in original musicals. Her portrayal of Mrs. Lovett surprised many, as she had primarily played innocent and resentful characters in the past.

In January 2020, Kim reprised her role as Yoon Yeo-ok in the musical Eyes of Dawn, alongside Choi Woo-ri and Park Jung-ah in a triple casting. Shortly after, she played Choi Dae-soon, the older sister of Dae-hyun, in the TV series Backstreet Rookie, starring Ji Chang-wook and Kim Yoo-jung. The show, based on the webtoon She's Too Much for Meby Hwalhwasan, aired on SBS TV from June 19 to August 8, 2020. While the drama was airing, Kim participated in a trial performance of the new musical Let Me Fly, hosted by the Wooran Cultural Foundation. This musical, part of the Wooran Beyond Performing Arts Development Program, took place from July 5 to 7 at Wooran 2nd Scene Theater. The story follows Nam-won, a character aspiring to be a fashion designer in 1969, and includes elements of time travel. Kim played the role of old Seon-hee, Nam-won's love interest. After completing the trial performances, Kim began filming a supporting role as Na-na in the road movie The Box, which features EXO's Chanyeol as a budding singer and Jo Dal-hwan as a former popular producer. Directed by Yang Jung-woong and produced by Studio Take, the film chronicles their musical journey and premiered in South Korea on March 24, 2021.

In 2021, Kim filmed the TV series Artificial City, with principal photography began on March 29, 2021. By May 2021, reports confirmed her casting in the series, where she portrayed Lee Joo-yeon, the wife of Jung Joon-il and the representative of 'Space Jin.' The show premiered on JTBC on December 8, 2021, airing every Wednesday and Thursday. Kim also took on the role of Aldonza Lorenza in her second licensed musical, Man of La Mancha, sharing the role with Yoon Gong-joo and Choi Soo-jin in a triple casting. The musical ran at the Charlotte Theater in Jamsil, Seoul, from February to March 1, followed by an extended run at the Chungmu Arts Center Grand Theater from March 24 to May 16. Initially, Hong Gwang-ho played Don Quixote, but Cho Seung-woo took over the role during the extended run, with both actors double-cast alongside Ryu Jeong-han. In October, Kim also made a special appearance as Seon-ah, Seong-hyun's cousin and Jung-woo's wife, in episodes 14 and 15 of the tvN series Hometown Cha-Cha-Cha.

In 2022, Kim appeared in her first television lead role alongside Son Ye-jin and Jeon Mi-do in JTBC's TV series Thirty-Nine, a romantic drama about three friends. She also graced the cover of The Musical magazine's March issue and reprised her role as Seon-hee in the musical Let Me Fly. In May, Kim joined the cast of Netflix Original Series D.P. for its second season, playing Lieutenant Colonel Seo-eun, the head of the Operations Department in the Ministry of Defense's prosecution team. Her character had a significant impact on the events of the drama. Kim worked with director Min Sae-rom in play based on the 2013 novel Réparer les vivants (Mend the Living) by Maylis de Kerangal.

At the end of 2023, Kim played the role of Song Seo-kyung, the second female lead in the drama series Tell Me That You Love Me. The series is based on the 1995 Japanese TV show Aishiteiru to Itte Kure and stars Jung Woo-sung and Shin Hyun-been. Song Seo-kyung is Jin-woo's (Jung Woo-sung) college classmate and ex-lover, who is the director of an art center. The drama is an original production of Genie TV and is available for streaming on its platform, as well as on Disney+ in certain regions. It aired on ENA from November 27, 2023, to January 16, 2024, every Monday and Tuesday.

== Filmography ==
=== Film ===
Year	Title	Role	Notes	Ref.
2006	Solace	Lee Mi-ran	minor role	
2009	A Little Pond	Hyun	minor role	
2014	My Dictator		minor role	
2015	Granny's Got Talent		minor role	
2020	King of Prison		minor role	
2021	The Box	Na-na		
2024	Pilot	Jung-woo's wife		

=== Television series ===
Year	Title	Role	Notes	Ref.
2008	Cooking up Romance	Kim Mi-sun		
2010	Jejungwon	Chwi-ran		
2010	My Sister's March	Heo Yang-mi		
2014	I'm Dying Soon	Min-hee	Drama Special ep.6	
2018	The Smile Has Left Your Eyes	Jang Se-ran		
2019	Justice	Cha Nam-sik		
2019	Romance Is a Bonus Book	Interviewer	Cameo (Ep. 1, 3, 11, 12)	
2020	Backstreet Rookie	Choi Dae-soon		
2021	Hometown Cha-Cha-Cha	Kim Seon-ah	Cameo (Ep. 14, 15)	
2021	Artificial City	Lee Joo-yeon		
2022	Thirty-Nine	Jang Joo-hee	Main Role	
2023	Tell Me That You Love Me	Song Seo-kyung		
2024	The Auditors	Seo Hee-Jin	Cameo (Ep. 9,10)	
2025	Law and the City	Kim Ryu-Jin		
2025	A Hundred Memories	Sung Man-Ok		
2025	Heroes Next Door	Jung Nam-Yeon	Main Role	
2026	Still Shining	Amy Park (Park So Hyun)		

=== Web series ===
Year	Title	Role	Notes	Ref.
2023	D.P. 2	Seo-eun		

== Stage ==
=== Musical ===
Musical performance(s)
Year	Title		Role	Theater	Date	Ref.
Year	English	Korean	Role	Theater	Date	Ref.
2004	The Mirror Princess Pyeonggang Story; 2004 Acappela Festival Official Opening Work	거울공주 평강이야기; 2004 아카펠라 페스티발 공식 오픈작	Natural water Sara	Inkel Art Hall Building 2	October 12 to November 7	
2004	The Mirror Princess Pyeonggang Story	거울공주 평강이야기	Natural water Sara	Seoul Arts Center	December 13 to 15	
2004	Finding Mr. Destiny	김종욱 찾기	Female	Seoul Arts Center	December 17 to 19	
2005	The Mirror Princess Pyeonggang Story; Small Theater Festival	거울공주 평강이야기	Natural water Sara	Small Theater Festival	January 25	
2005	The Mirror Princess Pyeonggang Story; Small Theater Festival	거울공주 평강이야기	Natural water Sara	Small Theater Festival	January 27–February 20	
2005	The Mirror Princess Pyeonggang Story; Small Theater Festival	거울공주 평강이야기	Natural water Sara	Small Theater Festival	March 1 to 27	
2005	The Mirror Princess Pyeonggang Story; The 2nd Busan International Theater Festival	거울공주 평강이야기	Natural water Sara	Busan Cultural Center and Busan Citizens' Center	May 5 to 15	
2005	The Mirror Princess Pyeonggang Story; 2005 Uijeongbu International Music Theatre Festival	(2005) 의정부국제음악극축제; 거울공주 평강이야기 - 아카펠라 뮤지컬	Natural water Sara	Uijeongbu Arts Centre Small Theater	May 21 to 22	
2005	The Mirror Princess Pyeonggang Story; The Chuncheon International Theater Festival	거울공주 평강이야기	Natural water Sara	Gangwon-do Chuncheon City Culture and Arts Center	June 26 to 30	
2005	The Mirror Princess Pyeonggang Story; The Milyang Summer Performing Arts Festival	거울공주 평강이야기	Natural water Sara	Miryang Summer Performing Arts Festival	July 26 to October 30	
2005	The Mirror Princess Pyeonggang Story; The 2005 Gwacheon Hanmadang Festival	거울공주 평강이야기	Natural water Sara	Civic Center Small Theater	September 23 to 24	
2005	The Mirror Princess Pyeonggang Story	거울공주 평강이야기	Natural water Sara	Daehakro Guerrilla Theater	September 27 to October 5	
2005	The Mirror Princess Pyeonggang Story; The 2005 Seoul Arts Market	거울공주 평강이야기	Natural water Sara	National Theater in Jangchung-dong, Seoul	October 6 to 8	
2006	Arco Arts Theatre Planning Program; The Mirror Princess Pyeonggang Story - The Power of Our Musical	아르코예술극장 기획프로그램; 거울공주 평강이야기 - 우리 뮤지컬의 힘	Yeon-yi	Arko Arts Theater Small Theater	February 2 to 19, 2006	
2006	The Mirror Princess Pyeonggang Story	거울공주 평강이야기	Yeon-yi	Seoul Arts Center's Byeolmuri Theater	July 14 to 15, 2006	
2007–2008	Finding Mr. Destiny Season 3	김종욱 찾기 3	Woman Finding Her 1st Love	JTN Art Hall 1 (Daehakro Arts Plaza Hall 1)	October 23–February 17	
2008	Finding Mr. Destiny Season 3	김종욱 찾기 3	Woman Finding Her 1st Love	JTN Art Hall 1 (Daehakro Arts Plaza Hall 1)	September 5	
2009	Finding Mr. Destiny Season 3	김종욱 찾기 3	Woman Finding Her 1st Love	Daegu Bongsan Cultural Center Grand Performance Hall (Gaon Hall)	01.14–02.15	
2009	Finding Mr. Destiny Season 3	김종욱 찾기 3	Woman Finding Her 1st Love	Daejeon Arts Center Ensemble Hall	02.26–03.01	
2009–2010	Spring Awakening	스프링 어웨이크닝	Female	Doosan Art Center Yonkang Hall	June 30, 2009 to January 10, 2010	
2010	Prince Puzzle	왕세자 실종사건	Jung-jeon	Ansan Arts Center Dalmaji Theater	October 1 to 2	
2010	Prince Puzzle	왕세자 실종사건	Jung-jeon	Doosan Art Center Space111	October 11 to November 7	
2011	Finding Mr. Destiny; 5th Anniversary	김종욱 찾기	Woman Finding Her 1st Love	Seoul Theater Center in Daehak-ro, Seoul	June	
2011	Finding Mr. Destiny; Handsome Party Season 3	김종욱 찾기 - 훈남파티 시즌3	Woman Finding Her 1st Love	JTN Art Hall 1 (Daehakro Arts Plaza Hall 1)	September 26	
2012	Caffeine	카페인	Kim Se-jin	Plus Theater (Culture Space NU)	February 2 to April 15	
2013	Pungwolju	풍월주	Queen Jin-seong	Amuse Musical Theater in Roppongi, Tokyo	June 21 to July 21	
2013	Bungee Jump	번지점프를 하다	Tae-hee	Doosan Arts Center Yonkang Hall	September 27–November 17	
2013–2014	Pungwolju	풍월주	Queen Jin-seong	Dongsung Arts Center Dongsung Hall	November 9–February 16	
2014	Caffeine	카페인	Kim Se-jin	KT&G Sangsang Madang Daechi Art Hall	06.27–08.07	
2014–2015	Those Days	그날들	Geunyeo (Her)	Daehangno Musical Center Grand Theater	Oct 21 – January 18, 2015	
2014–2015	Love Letter	러브레터	Itsuki Fujii and Hiroko Watanabe	Dongsung Arts Center Dongsung Hall	12.02–02.15	
2015	Those Days	그날들	Geunyeo (Her)	Daegu Keimyung Art Center	April 4–5	
2015	Those Days	그날들	Geunyeo (Her)	Centum City Sohyang Theater Shinhan Card Hall	April 17–19	
2015	Those Days	그날들	Geunyeo (Her)	Gyeongnam Culture and Arts Center Grand Performance Hall	May 16–17	
2015	Those Days	그날들	Geunyeo (Her)	Jeju Art Center	May 30–31	
2015	Those Days	그날들	Geunyeo (Her)	Centum City Sohyang Theater Shinhan Card Hall	Dec 2–4	
2016	Go with God	신과 함께 가라	Kiara	Dongsung Arts Center Dongsung Hall	02.23–03.06	
2016	Those Days	그날들	Geunyeo (Her)	Chungmu Art Center Grand Theater	Aug 25 – Nov 3	
2016	Hi! UFO	안녕! 유에프오	Yoo Kyung	Artine Theater Hall 1	Oct 5–30	
2016	Those Days	그날들	Geunyeo (Her)	Daegu Keimyung Art Center	Nov 12–13	
2016	Those Days	그날들	Geunyeo (Her)	Gyeonggi Arts Center Grand Theater	Dec 10–11	
2016	Those Days	그날들	Geunyeo (Her)	Guri Art Hall Cosmos Grand Theater	Dec 16–17	
2016	Those Days	그날들	Geunyeo (Her)	GS Caltex Yeulmaru Grand Theater	Dec 23–25	
2017	Those Days	그날들	Geunyeo (Her)	Seongnam Art Center Opera House	Jan 21–22	
2017	Those Days	그날들	Geunyeo (Her)	Seoul Arts Center Opera Theater	Feb 7 – March 5	
2017–2018	Hourglass	모래시계	Yoon Hye-Rin	Chungmu Art Center Grand Theater	12.05–02.11	
2018	Hourglass	모래시계	Yoon Hye-Rin	Gwangju Culture and Arts Center Grand Theater	02.23–02.25	
2018	Bungee Jump	번지점프를 하다	Tae-hee	Sejong Center for the Performing Arts Grand Theater	06.12–08.26	
2018–2019	Pungwolju	풍월주	Queen Jin-seong	Uniplex Hall 1 (Grand Theater)	12.04–02.17	
2019	Eyes of Dawn	여명의 눈동자	Yoon Yeo-ok	Daesung D Cube Art Center	03.01–04.14	
2019–2020	Sweeney Todd	스위니토드	Mrs. Lovett	Charlotte Theater	10.02–01.27	
2020	Eyes of Dawn	여명의 눈동자	Yoon Yeo-ok	Sejong Center for the Performing Arts Grand Theater	01.23–02.27	
2020	Let Me Fly	렛미플라이	Seon-hee	Wooran Cultural Foundation	Jul 5–7	
2021	Man of La Mancha	맨 오브 라만차	Aldonza Lorenzo	Charlotte Theater	February 2 to March 1	
2021	Man of La Mancha	맨 오브 라만차	Aldonza Lorenzo	Daejeon Arts Center Art Hall	March 10 to 14	
2021	Man of La Mancha	맨 오브 라만차	Aldonza Lorenzo	Chungmu Arts Center Grand Theater	March 24 – May 16	
2022	Let Me Fly	렛미플라이	Seon-hee	Yes24 Stage1	Mar 22–Jun 19	
2022–2023	Sweeney Todd	스위니토드	Mrs. Lovett	Charlotte Theater	Dec 1 – Mar 5	
2023	Those Days	그날들	geunyeo	Seoul Arts Centre Opera Theatre	July 12–September 3	
2023	Those Days	그날들	geunyeo	Daegu Keimyung Art Center	November 13–15	
2023–2024	Il Tenore	일 테노레	Seo Jin-yeon	Seoul Arts Centre CJ Towol Theatre	December 19-February 25	
2024	Il Tenore	일 테노레	Seo Jin-yeon	Blue Square Shinhan Card Hall	March 29-May 19	
2024-2025	If/Then	이프/덴	Elizabeth	Hongik University Daehakro Art Center Grand Theater	December 3-March 2	
2026	Beethoven	베토벤	Anthonie Brentano	Sejong Center for the Performing Arts Grand Theater	June 9-August 11	

=== Theater ===
Stage play performance(s)
Year	Title		Role	Theater	Date	Ref.
Year	English	Korean	Role	Theater	Date	Ref.
2004	Incomplete Life	미생자		Cultural Arts Foundation Arts Theater Small Theater	March 18 to 28, 2004	
2004	2004 Seoul Theatre Festival: Incomplete Life	(2004) 서울연극제 : 미생자		National Theater Byuloreum Theater	May 19 to 23, 2004	
2005	Korea Fantasy	마르고 닳도록		Seoul Arts Center's Freedom Small Theater	December 1 to 17, 2005	
2007	The Mask		Do-dam	Daehak-ro Guerrilla Theater	01.12–01.28	
2007	Annapurna in My Heart	내 마음의 안나푸르나	Mother	Daehak-ro Star City	07.04–07.15	
2007	Byun - A Grotesque Comedy	변 - A Grotesque Comedy		Arko Arts Theater Small Theater	August 31 to September 14	
2007	You loved him	그자식 사랑했네	Mi-young	Arko Art Theater Small Theater	12.11–12.30	
2008	Let's go! Third, "Annapurna in My Heart"	우르르~간다! 세 번째 <내 마음의 안나푸르나>	Mother	the theater that came out	05.16–06.18	
2010	B-eonso	B언소(蜚言所)		Art One Chaimu Theater	February 5 to May 2	
2010	The Story of Yang Deok-won	양덕원 이야기	Na-young	Art One Theater Hall 3	May 7 to August 29	
2010	The Story of Yang Deok-won	양덕원 이야기	Na-young	Yongin Arts Center Maru Hall	November 20	
2013–2014	Almost, Maine	올모스트 메인	Glory, Waitress, Gayle	Sangmyung Art Hall 1	11.11–01.19	
2014	The Cosmonaut's Last Message to the Woman He Once Loved in the Former Soviet Union	한때 사랑했던 여자에게 보내는 구소련 우주비행사의 마지막 메시지	Natasha	Myeongdeong Arts Theater	04.16–05.11	
2014	Theatre's Heated Battle 5 - The Pride	연극열전5 - 프라이드	Sylvia	Art One Theater Hall 2	Aug 16 – Nov 9	
2015	Speaking in Tongues	스피킹 인 텅스	Jane & Sarah	Yes 24 Stage 3	May 1 – July 19	
2015	Late Autumn	만추	Anna	Art One Theater Hall 1	10.10–11.08	
2015	The Curious Incident of the Dog in the Night-Time	한밤중에 개에게 일어난 의문의 사건	Teacher Shioban	Gwanglim Art Center BBCH Hall	Nov 27 – Feb 6	
2016	Almost, Maine	올모스트 메인	Glory, Waitress, Gayle	Sangmyung Art Hall 1	01.08–07.03	
2016	Capone Trilogy	카포네 트릴로지	Lady	Hongik University Daehangno Art Center Small Theater	July 5, 2016 – September 18, 2016	
2016–2017	Bunker Trilogy	벙커 트릴로지	soldier 4	Hongik University Daehangno Art Center Small Theater	December 6, 2016 – February 19, 2017	
2017	The Pride	프라이드	Sylvia	Art One Theater Hall 2	Mar 21 – Jul 2	
2018	Capone Trilogy	카포네 트릴로지	Lady	Hongik University Daehangno Art Center Small Theater	03.20–06.17	
2019	Pride and Prejudice	오만과 편견	A1	Chungmu Arts Center Medium Theater Black	08.27–10.20	
2020	Pride and Prejudice	오만과 편견	A1	Yes 24 Stage 3	09.19–11.29	
2022	Heal the Living	살아있는 자를 수선하기	Narrator et al.	Lee Hae-rang Arts Theater	07.26–09.04	
2024	Heal the Living	살아있는 자를 수선하기	Narrator et al.	National Jeongdong Theater	Jan 20 – Mar 20	
2024	Flower, Past the Stars	꽃, 별이 지나	Mi-ho	Seokyeong University Performing Arts Center Scone Hall 1	June 8, 2024	
2026	Heal the Living	살아있는 자를 수선하기	Narrator et al.	National Jeongdong Theater	Jan 13 – Mar 8	

== Awards and nominations ==
Sortable table of awards and nominations for Kim Ji-hyun
Award ceremony	Year	Category	Nominee / Work	Result	Ref.
APAN Star Awards	2022	Best Supporting Actress	Thirty-Nine	Nominated	
Interpark Golden Ticket Awards (Note: The Golden Ticket Awards (골든티켓어워즈) is an awards ceremony that selects works and people who have shown the best ticket power by performance genre during the year. Since 2005, Interpark has held an awards ceremony by adding up ticket sales, ranking scores, and online voting for each year at the end of the year.)	2015	Best Actress in a Play	Speaking in Tongues, Capone Trilogy	Won	
Interpark Golden Ticket Awards	2016	Best Actress in a Play	Capone Trilogy	Nominated	
Interpark Golden Ticket Awards	2017–2018	Best Actress in a Play	The Pride	Nominated	
Interpark Golden Ticket Awards	2018–2019	Best Actress in a Play	Capone Trilogy	Nominated	
15th Korea Musical Awards	2009	Ensemble Award	Spring Awakening	Won	
7th Miryang Summer Performing Arts Festival	2007	Best Actress	That Kid Loved Me	Won	
Stage Talk Audience's Choice Awards (SACA) (Note: StageTalk Audience's Choice Awards (SACA) is theater and musical award festival that decides the winner based on pure votes from fans of the performance.)	2015	Best Actress Theater	Speaking in Tongues, Capone Trilogy, and Late Autumn	Won	
Stage Talk Audience's Choice Awards (SACA)	2016	Best Actress Theater	Almost, Maine; Capone Trilogy	Nominated	
Stage Talk Audience's Choice Awards (SACA)	2016	Best Supporting Actress Theater	The Curious Incident of the Dog in the Night-Time	Nominated	
Stage Talk Audience's Choice Awards (SACA)	2017	Best Supporting Actress Theater	The Pride	Nominated	
Stage Talk Audience's Choice Awards (SACA)	2018	Best Actress Theater	Capone Trilogy	Nominated	
Stage Talk Audience's Choice Awards (SACA)	2019	Best Actress Theater	Pride and Prejudice	Nominated	
