= Jeon Mi-do =

South Korean actress (born 1982)

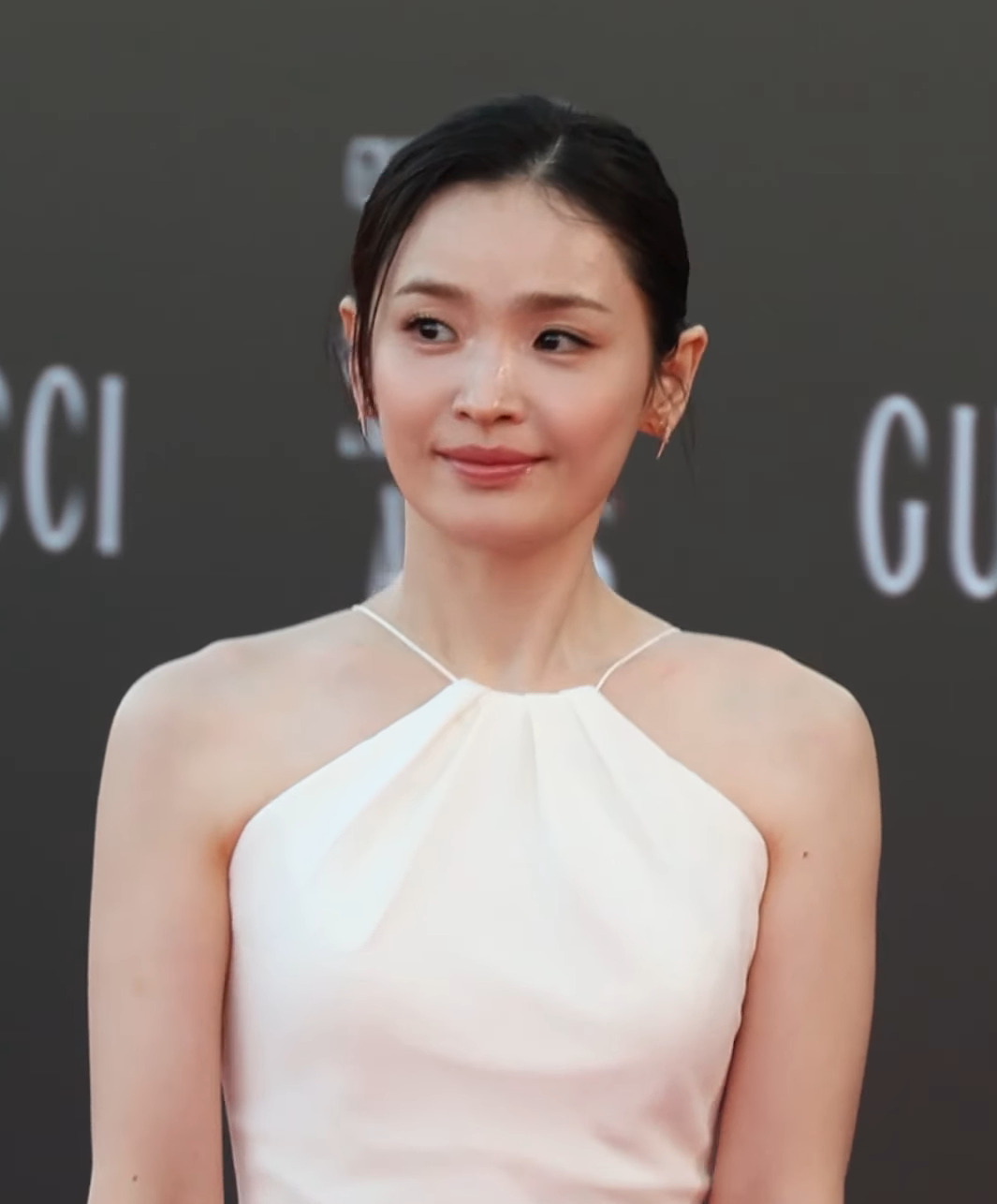
- Jeon in 2026
- Born: August 4, 1982 (age 44); Busan, South Korea
- Education: Myongji University (Department of Theater and Film)
- Occupations: Actress; singer; theater actor; musical actor
- Years active: 2006–present
- Agents: Bistus Entertainment; Medialab Siso
- Spouse: Unknown (m. 2013)

Korean name
- Hangul: 전미도
- RR: Jeon Mido
- MR: Chŏn Mido

Jeon Mi-do (Korean: 전미도; born August 4, 1982) is a South Korean actress and singer. She debuted as ensemble cast in musical Mr. Mouse in 2006. She later made a name for herself by appearing in famous works such as the musical Finding Kim Jong-wook, Doctor Zhivago, and Maybe Happy Ending. In 2015, she won the Best Actress Award at the 9th The Musical Awards, and in 2017 and 2018, she once again bagged the Best Actress Award back-to-back at the 1st and 2nd Korean Musical Awards, respectively.

She transitioned to the small screen with her first television role in the series Mother (2018), and gained wider recognition for her prominent role as Dr. Chae Song-hwa in Hospital Playlist (2020–2021). She subsequently starred in the series Thirty-Nine (2022) alongside actresses Son Ye-jin and Kim Ji-hyun.

== Early life ==
Jeon Mi-do, born on August 4, 1982, in Busan, is the only daughter among three siblings. After her father's death, she and her two brothers were raised by their mother. Jeon aspired to be a theater actress from the third grade, inspired by a church play she attended. During her elementary years, she participated in a group reading of a play called The One-Legged Goose from a Korean language textbook, practicing with a friend. She memorized her lines easily and performed confidently, which led her to recognize her interest in acting.

"I first saw the musical Grease starring Yoo Jun-sang, in Busan when I was in high school. It was a shocking experience. I was convinced and thought, 'That's what I'm going to do.'"

— Jeon on her dream of becoming musical actress

Initially focused on her studies, Jeon dropped out of school in her second year of middle school but returned a year later, continuing her education alongside her younger siblings. While attending, Busan Dongho Information Girls' High School, she watched her first musical, Grease, which reinforced her desire to pursue a career in theater.

During her teenage years, Jeon found it challenging to communicate with her family and sought friendships where she could express herself openly. She turned to singing and often visited karaoke. In her third year of high school, a friend invited her to join a female band called "Dali", which performed at various boys' high school festivals. Her mother expressed concern about Jeon's focus on music rather than academics. Later, Jeon expressed her intention to enroll in the Department of Theater and Film, which surprised her mother. However, Jeon's persistence led to her mother's eventual approval. She began her studies later than her peers but felt motivated by her aspirations and successfully enrolled in the Theater and Film Department at Myongji University in Seoul.

After relocating to Seoul, Jeon's college friends were unaware of her Busan origins because she worked diligently to adopt the Seoul accent, which she deemed essential for her acting career. While she successfully adjusted her accent, mastering the local dialect presented challenges, occasionally causing others to view her as aloof. Through her involvement in stage performances, she refined her speech and personality, participating in approximately 12 productions before graduating.

== Career ==
=== 2006–2009: Early career and stage debut ===
After graduating from Myongji University, Jeon Mi-do made her debut in 2006 as Yang Yang-yi in the musical Mr. Mouse. In 2007, she made her theater debut in the play Liar, followed by the musical White Proposal in 2008, where she portrayed the role of a high school girl.

In 2008, Jeon and Park Hae-soo starred together in the Korean adaptation of the musical Spring Awakening, titled Puberty. Jeon chose to participate in this musical as it allowed her to showcase her acting range. Her performance was well-received, as she portrayed five different roles, including a high school girl, a teacher, a nurse, a cafe madam, and a stepmother. For her work in this production, she was nominated for the Best New Actress Award.

"At first, it was challenging because I couldn't fully portray Agnes's emotional pain. However, as time passed, I found ways to gradually connect with her character. I deliberately searched for my own childhood experiences and reflected upon them. I realized that I had to genuinely express my emotions on stage, rather than relying solely on acting skills."

— Jeon on Agnes of God

Later in 2008, Jeon was double-cast with Park Hye-jung in the play Agnes of God, performed at the Daehakro Installation Theater Jeongmiso from December 6 to January 10, 2009. For her performance as Agnes, Jeon received the Best New Actress Award at the 2008 Korean Theater Awards.

To diversify her roles following Agnes of God, Jeon auditioned for the romantic comedy musical Finding Kim Jong-wook in 2009 and secured the female lead in the musical's fourth season. This production attracted attention as both Oh Na-ra, the original female protagonist, and Jeon were cast in leading roles.

In October 2009, Jeon took on a significant supporting role in the musical Hero, directed by Yoon Ho-jin. The musical is based on the final year of An Jung-geun's life, detailing his plans for the assassination of Itō Hirobumi in Harbin and his subsequent execution. Jeon portrayed Ling-ling, a fictional 16-year-old Chinese girl who conceals her feelings for Ahn Jung-geun. Ling-ling is fatally shot by a Japanese soldier while protecting Ahn and dies in his arms. In the play Hoya, directed by Seo Jae-hyung, Jeon played Lady Eo, a noblewoman who becomes involved with the king while harboring feelings for another man.

In May 2010, Splendid Holiday, a musical based on the 2007 film May 18, premiered in Gwangju and was performed at the National Theater's Haeoreum Theater on June 12 and 13. Jeon portrayed Shin-ae, a young nurse residing in Gwangju, receiving attention for her performance.

Jeon played Ja-sook in musical The Case of the Crown Prince's Disappearance, created by director Seo Jae-hyung and writer Han Ah-reum, which originated from a play.

In April 2011, she acted alongside Seo Sang-won, Kim Young-pil, and Kim Joo-wan in the play The Author by British playwright Tim Crouch.

Jeon is a member of Theater Company Man Theater, (Note: The theater company Man Theater (맨씨어터) was founded in 2007 by CEO Woo Hyeon-joo along with actresses in their mid-to-late 30s who were close friends at the time, including Jeong Jae-eun and Jeong Su-young. It has a brilliant line-up, with male actors showing outstanding performances such as Lee Seok-jun and Park Ho-san, star actors such as Jeon Mi-do, and young actors such as Lee Chang-hoon, Koo Do-gyun, and Lee Eun.) led by CEO Woo Hyeon-joo. In 2011, Man Theater produced Anton Chekov's play The Seagull, directed by Oh Gyeong-taek, marking a reunion for Jeon and Park Hae-soo after their collaboration in Puberty in 2008.

=== 2010–2016: Breakthrough roles and musical success ===
In 2012, Jeon Mi-do achieved a significant milestone in her career by securing the lead role in a licensed musical for the first time. She made her stage debut as Lara Antipova in the South Korean premiere of the musical Doctor Zhivago, a role she shared with Kim Ji-woo. In the first half of 2012, Jeon played the female lead in the original musical Bungee Jumping, which was based on the film of the same name starring Lee Byung-hun and Lee Eun-ju. In this production, Jeon alternated the role of the bold and lovely Tae-hee with Choi Yu-ha.

In October, Jeon returned to the theater with Man Theater, taking on the role of Anya, the daughter of Ranevskaya, in Anton Chekhov's play The Cherry Orchard, directed by Oh Gyeong-taek. The play ran from October 12 to 28, 2012, at the Sejong Center for the Performing Arts M Theater. It was later invited to the 'Stanislavsky Birth 150th Anniversary Festival' in early February 2013 at the Stanislavsky Theater in Moscow, though Jeon did not participate in that event.

"It really wasn't an easy task. Expressing Shakespeare's numerous lines was not an easy task. The amount was very large, but compared to that, the practice period was not enough. There were problems with Chinese director Tian Chin-xin's schedule, and the script came out a bit late. It was difficult because I was in a situation where I had to rush to create emotions even though many words hadn't even entered my mind yet.

— Jeon on working on Romeo and Juliet

Jeon's final project in 2012 was her portrayal of Juliet in Shakespeare's Romeo and Juliet. This production was a collaboration between the National Theater Company and the China National Theater Company, commemorating the 20th anniversary of diplomatic relations between South Korea and China. Directed by, Tian, Chin-xin, the only female director of the China National Theater Company, the play was performed at the National Theater Haorum Theater from December 18 to 29, 2012. Tian adapted the setting of Verona to China during the height of the Cultural Revolution.

After the performance of Romeo and Juliet, Jeon took a week-long break before beginning rehearsals for the musical The Mirror Princess' Pyeonggang Story in January 2013. She was scheduled to start performing in February, playing the role of Yeon-yi, the maid of honor to the female protagonist, Princess Pyeonggang.

Initially, Jeon believed there was a clear distinction between stage plays and musicals; however, this distinction began to fade over time. In 2013, she reflected on her experience in 14 Chekhovs, a collection of Anton Chekhov's one-act plays, noting a long monologue by Park Jeong-ja that had a rhythm similar to singing. Jeon realized that stage plays could have a musical flow, while musicals often emphasized dialogue. She explained, "Since then, when delivering lines in stage plays, I have incorporated intensity and tension, making it more dynamic. When singing in musicals, I approached it more like speaking, which made it feel much more natural".

In July 2013, Jeon portrayed Yeon-woo in the original musical adaptation of the drama The Moon Embracing the Sun. The musical had its preview performance at Poeun Art Hall in Yongin on June 8, 2013, receiving a standing ovation from the 1,000 audience members present. It was performed at the CJ Towol Theater at the Seoul Arts Center from July 6 to 31, with additional regional performances planned in Daegu and Busan in August, and in Tokyo, Japan, in December.

In the musical Werther, based on the novel The Sorrows of Young Werther by Goethe, Jeon played the role of Charlotte. The production was staged at the CJ Towol Theater in the Seoul Arts Center until January 12, 2014.

Jeon's next role was Mephistopheles in the play Mephisto, directed by Seo Jae-hyung. This adaptation of Goethe's Faust, featured Jeon embodying a character that combined both male and female qualities as well as human and animal traits. The production was staged at the CJ Towol Theater from April 4 to 19, 2014.

In May 2014, Jeon performed alongside Kim Tae-geun in the play Some Girls, produced by Man Theater, which ran at the Dongsoong Arts Center Small Theater until July 20. Later in the end of 2014, she took on the role of 'Girl' in the musical Once. To prepare, she dedicated herself to learning the piano, studying the Czech language, and understanding the character's traits.

In 2015, Jeon secured her dream role as Aldonza in the musical Man of La Mancha, which celebrated its 10th anniversary in South Korea. This was a role she had expressed interest in during interviews for several years. The performance took place at the D Cube Art Center from July 30 to November 11. While involved in Man of La Mancha, Jeon also joined the cast of Maybe Happy Ending, a musical created by Hue Park and Will Aronson. The project, initially pitched to the Wooran Cultural Foundation in February 2014, was further developed under the direction of Kim Dong-yeon. Jeon participated based on her trust in the creators, stemming from their previous collaboration on Bungee Jumping. The musical had a try-out at Project Box Seeya in September 2015 and quickly sold out. Written in both Korean and English, it was showcased in a workshop in New York in 2016 and the English version received the 2017 Richard Rodgers Award. At the end of 2015, Jeon reprised her role as Charlotte in the encore of Werther, performed at the CJ Towol Theater until January 10, 2016.

In April 2016, Jeon returned to Man Theater, portraying Yeon Baek-hee in the play Heuk Heuk Heuk Hee Hee Hee. Baek-hee is an astronaut who, after fulfilling her dream, falls ill with an incurable heart disease and undergoes a transformation in her outlook on life through her encounter with Jin Heuk-cheol, a comedian who faces criticism and abandonment.

In June 2016, Jeon was cast as Mrs. Lovett in the musical Sweeney Todd. Initially, many assumed she would play the character Joanna, leading to confusion when she announced her role as Mrs. Lovett. Despite initial doubts, Jeon embraced the challenge, and her performance earned her a nomination for Best Musical Actress at the 2016 Stage Talk Audience's Choice Awards (SACA), (Note: StageTalk Audience's Choice Awards (SACA) is theater and musical award festival that decides the winner based on pure votes from fans of the performance.) and the Best Actress Award at the 1st Korean Musical Awards in 2017, based on votes from both the audience and experts.

Following the final performance of Sweeney Todd, Jeon began rehearsing for the play BEA, originally written and directed by British playwright Mick Gordon in 2010. Directed by, Kim, Kwang-bo and produced by Man Theater, it explores the theme of euthanasia. For her performance in BEA, Jeon won the Best Theater Actress award at the 2016 Stage Talk Audience's Choice Awards (SACA).

=== 2017–present: Transition to television and rising popularity ===
At the end of 2016, Jeon Mi-do reprised her role as Claire in the premiere performance of the musical Maybe Happy Ending, which was selected for the Seeya Stage. (Note: SEEYA STAGE is a program that supports development potential by selecting some of the performance/exhibition personnel and contents who have participated in various programs of the Wooran Foundation. It was designed to provide opportunities for performances or overseas training at home and abroad to human resources and contents judged to be able to secure artistic and commercial competitiveness in Korea, and to support people and contents who have gone through the Wooran Foundation to have cultural competitiveness.) Produced by the Daemyung Cultural Factory, the musical premiered at Lifeway Hall in DCF Daemyung Cultural Factory's second building from December 20, 2016, to March 5, 2017, running for 51 performances. The premiere was directed by Kim Dong-yeon, who had also directed the tryout performance the previous September. An encore performance was held at the same venue from October 23 to November 12, 2017, and it sold out all seats before opening, continuing the popularity of the premiere. For her performance as Claire, Jeon received critical acclaim, winning two popularity awards: the Women Popularity Award at the 2017 Yegreen Musical Awards and the Best Musical Actress Award at the 2017 Stage Talk Audience's Choice Awards. She also won the Best Actress Award at the 2018 Korea Musical Awards.

In November 2017, Jeon was cast in tvN 2018 series Mother portraying Ra-ra, the former lover of Lee Seol-ak (Son Seok-ku). She officially made her television debut when the show aired from January 24 to March 15, 2018. Despite her limited screen time, she left a strong impression.

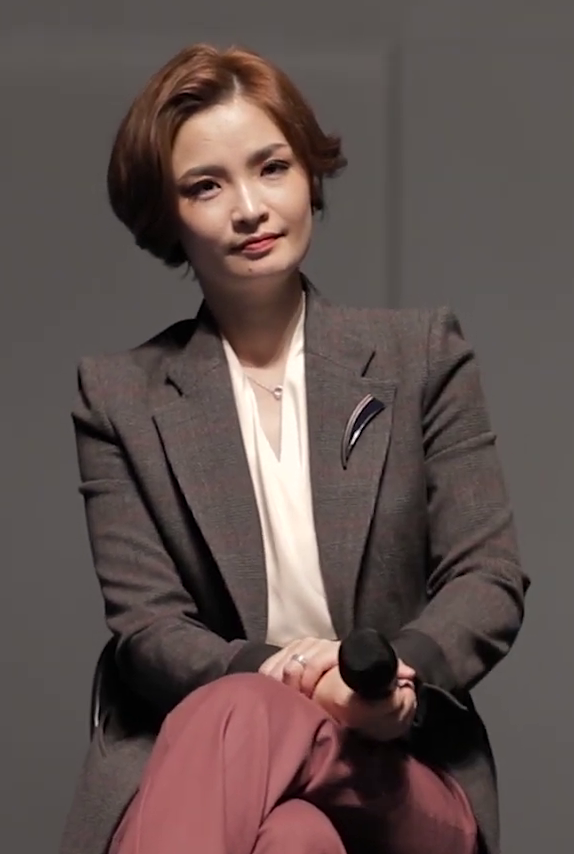
Jeon on October 14, 2018

In March 2018, Jeon reprised her role as Lara Antipova in the musical Doctor Zhivago, sharing the role with Jo Jeong-eun and performing alternately at the Charlotte Theater until May 7. In the second quarter of 2018, Jeon played Mona Juul in J. T. Rogers' play Oslo, a diplomat involved in the peace agreement between Palestine and Israel. The performance took place at the Myeongdong Arts Theater from October 12 to November 4. She won the 2018 Stage Talk Audience's Choice Awards (SACA) for Best Theater Actor, further solidifying her reputation as a respected performer.

From September 2018, Jeon participated in the internal reading of the musical Paris Bakery, a new work by author Kim Han-sol and composer Kim Ki-yeon. A tryout performance was held four times at Wooran 2 from January 12 to 14, 2019. In December 2018, Jeon took part in a reading session for the musical Il Tenore, reuniting with Hue Park and Will Aronson. Set in 1930 Gyeongseong, it follows the stories of three individuals with forbidden dreams in a restrictive society.

The following year, Jeon made her big-screen debut in the fantasy film Metamorphosis. She landed her first lead role in Lee Woo-jung's drama Hospital Playlist, directed by Shin Won-ho. During the audition, she initially thought she was trying out for a patient role, but the director considered her for the lead role of Chae Song-hwa, an associate professor of neurosurgery. Shin stated that he felt she was destined for the role and noted that her casting was influenced by recommendations from Jo Jung-suk and Yoo Yeon-seok. The first season aired on tvN from March 12 to May 28, 2020.

Jeon received multiple awards for her performance in Hospital Playlist, including the Best Acting Award at the 2020 Asia Artist Awards and the Newcomer Actress Award at the 2020 Asia Contents Awards. She was also nominated for Best New Actress at the 56th Baeksang Arts Awards. In 2021, she won the Best New Actress award at the APAN Star Awards and was nominated for the Popular Star Award (Actress) at the same awards. For the drama's soundtrack, she sang a cover of Shin Hyo-beom's song "I Knew I Love" (사랑하게 될 줄 알았어), which peaked at number one on the Gaon Digital Chart.

In 2020, Jeon reprised her role as Claire in the encore of Maybe Happy Ending, joined by actresses Kang Hye-in and Han Jae-ah. She also reprised her role as Chae Song-hwa and began filming for season 2 of Hospital Playlist in late January 2021, which aired from June 17 to September 16, 2021.

In April 2021, it was reported that Jeon was in talks to appear in JTBC's TV series Thirty-Nine, a remake of the Chinese drama Nothing But Thirty, focusing on the lives and friendships of three friends nearing the age of forty. Jeon confirmed her participation in August, portraying Jeong Chan-young, a 39-year-old drama coach. The series premiered on JTBC on February 16, 2022.

Jeon decided to reprise her role as Mrs. Lovett in the 2022 encore of the musical Sweeney Todd after initially hesitating due to scheduling conflicts. With the postponement of overlapping schedules, she was able to focus fully on the production. Kim Ji-hyun, a close friend, also played a significant role in her decision. Both Jeon and Kim Ji-hyun were part of a triple cast in 2022, along with a new actress, Rina.

In December 2023, Jeon and Ji Sung were confirmed to star in the series Connection, marking her first lead role in a terrestrial channel drama since her acting debut in 2006. Jeon portrayed Oh Yun-jin, a social affairs reporter known for her assertiveness. Connection was premiered on SBS TV during the first half of 2024. On December 21, Jeon won the Best Acting Award in the Miniseries Genre/Action category at the 2024 SBS Drama Awards for her work in Connection.

On March 30, 2024, Jeon was invited to the Busan Sea Festival by the Lotte Giants for a special first pitch event.On July 16, she was appointed as one of the nine ambassadors for the 2024 Dream Theater Company. In August, Jeon appeared alongside her Hospital Playlist co-stars in a Netflix show titled A-List to Playlist, featuring Jo Jung-seok. On October 4 and 5, she participated as a narrator for the 10th anniversary memorial documentary of Shin Hae-chul titled Our Brother, Shin Hae-chul. On October 22, she appeared in the music video for the title track "그래도 돼" from Cho Yong-pil's 20th album, 20. On December 29, she appeared in Season 3 of KBS1's documentary Love Across the Sea, visiting a poverty-stricken region in Africa.

From January 17 to March 16, 2025, Jeon reprised her role as Charlotte for the 25th anniversary edition of the musical Werther. On March 24, she was announced to join the cast of the film The King's Warden. The film marked her first starring role in a commercial film. On April 10, her agency, Medialab Siso, announced that they had signed an exclusive contract with her. On May 11, 2025, Jeon made a cameo appearance in Resident Playbook, reprising her role as Chae Song-hwa from Hospital Playlist.

In October 2025, Jeon returned to the role of Claire in the 10th anniversary production of the musical Maybe Happy Ending, marking her first appearance in the role in about five years. Her scheduled performances ran until November 23, while the production itself continued at Doosan Art Center's Yonkang Hall until January 2026. The 10th anniversary production later held a national tour from February to June 2026, visiting 16 cities and selling out all 78 tour performances; Jeon was among the actors who appeared as Claire during the season.

On March 6, 2026, following its February 4 release, The King's Warden surpassed 10 million admissions on its 31st day, with Korean media describing Jeon as a "10-million actor". The film later exceeded 16.8 million admissions, making it the second most-viewed film in South Korean box-office history and the highest-grossing film released in South Korea at the time. Although media noted her relatively limited screen time and dialogue in the film, Jeon's performance earned her a nomination for Best Supporting Actress at the 62nd Baeksang Arts Awards, and received double nominations for both Best Actress and Best New Actress at the 24th Director's Cut Awards. She also sang "Friend" (Korean: 벗), a soundtrack single for the film.

In June 2026, Willa released the audiobook Pilsa, Eoreuni Doeneun Sigan (Korean: 필사, 어른이 되는 시간), narrated by Jeon as part of a talent donation project with the Jinsun Foundation for visually impaired readers. In August, she is scheduled to return to the stage in Man Theater's production of Anton Chekhov's The Seagull, reprising the role of Nina from August 9 to 31. The production marks her first play since Oslo in 2018 and her return to the role of Nina after 15 years.

== Personal life ==
In April 2013, Jeon married her non-celebrity boyfriend, whom she had met in July 2012 through a blind date. Just two months after their initial meeting, they decided to get married. Their engagement lasted six months.

== Filmography ==
=== Film ===
Year	Title	Role	Ref.
2019	Metamorphosis	Girl's mother	
2026	The King's Warden	Mae-hwa	

=== Television series ===
Year	Title	Role	Notes	Ref.
2018	Mother	Won-hee's mother	Cameo	
2020–2021	Hospital Playlist	Chae Song-hwa	Season 1–2	
2022	Thirty-Nine	Jeong Chan-young		
2024	Connection	Oh Yun-jin		
2025	Resident Playbook	Chae Song-hwa	Special Appearance (Ep 10)	
2027	There is a Winning Chance	TBA	Special appearance	

=== Television shows ===
Year	Title	Role	Notes	Ref.
2021	Wise Mountain Village Life	Cast member	With the cast of Hospital Playlist	
2024	Our Brother, Shin Hae-chul	Narrator	MBC special documentary	
2024	Love Across the Sea 3	Herself	Kenya episode	
2026	Human Documentary: Wish (휴먼다큐 소원)	Narrator	MBC Documentary Episode 4	

=== Web shows ===
Year	Title	Role	Notes	Ref.
2020	Mido and Falasol Live Concert	Performer	With the cast of Hospital Playlist	
2021	Hospital Playlist Goes Camping	Cast member	With the cast of Hospital Playlist	

=== Music video appearances ===
Year	Song title	Artist	Role	Ref.
2024	"It'll Be Okay" (그래도 돼)	Cho Yong-pil	Cast member	

== Stage ==
=== Theater ===
Theater performances
Year	Title		Role	Venue	Date	Ref.
Year	English	Korean	Role	Venue	Date	Ref.
2007	Liar 2	라이어 2탄	Vicky	Daehak-ro Live Theatre	January 5 – March 11	
2008	Agnes of God	신의 아그네	Agnes	Daehak-ro Installation Theatre Jeongmiso	December 6 – January 10	
2010	Hoya	호야 (好夜)	Lee Gwi-in	Namsan Arts Centre	January 23–31	
2011	The Author	디 오써	Mi-do	Doosan Art Centre Space111	April 26 – May 28	
2011	The Seagull	갈매기	Nina	Mary Hall, Sogang University	November 25 – December 11	
2012	The Cherry Orchard	벚꽃동산	Anya	Sejong Center for the Performing Arts M Theater	October 12–28	
2012	Romeo and Juliet	국립레퍼토리시즌 - 국립극단 로미오와 줄리엣	Juliet	National Theatre Haeoreum Theatre	December 18–29	
2013	14-person Chekhov	14인 체홉		Project Box SEEYA	June 18 – July 7	
2013	The 3rd Daehakro Comedy Festival - 14-person Chekhov	제3회 대학로 코미디페스티벌 - 14인 체홉		Daehak-ro Arts Theatre Small Theatre	August 17–22	
2014	SAC CUBE 2014 - Mephisto	SAC CUBE 2014 - 메피스토	Mephisto	Seoul Arts Center's CJ Towol Theater	April 4–19	
2014	Some Girls	썸걸즈	Mi-do	Dongsung Art Center Small Theater	May 6 – July 20	
2016	Hehehe Hahaha	흑흑흑 희희희	Yeon Baek-hee	Daehakro Arts Theater Small Theater	April 8–4	
2016	Bea	비 BEA	Bea	Project box vision	November 11–30	
2018	Oslo	오슬로	Mona Juul	Myeongdong Arts Theatre	October 12 – November 4	
2019	Regrets	후회화성	Alfi	8PM Seondol Theater	May 11	
2026	The Seagull	갈매기	Nina	Ticketlink 1975 Theater	August 9–31	

=== Musical ===
Musical performances
Year	Title		Role	Theater	Dates	Ref.
Year	English	Korean	Role	Theater	Dates	Ref.
2006–2007	Mr. Mouse	미스터 마우스	Yang Yang-yi	—	June 17 – January 1	
2008	White Proposal	화이트 프로포즈	Yeon-hee	—	January 11 – March 1	
2008	Puberty	사춘기	Soo-hee	Daehak-ro Installation Theatre Jeongmiso	August 15 – October 12	
2009–2011	Finding Mr. Destiny	김종욱 찾기	Woman	JTN Art Hall 1	March 2009–May 2011	
2009	Hero	영웅	Ling-ling	LG Art Center	October 26 – December 31	
2010	Splendid Holiday	화려한 휴가	Shin-ae	National Theater Haeoreum Theater	June 12–13	
2010	Crown Prince's Disappearance	왕세자 실종사건	Ja-sook	Doosan Art Center Space111	October 11 – November 7	
2010–2011	Hero	영웅	Ling-ling	National Theatre Haeoreum Theatre	December 4 – January 15	
2011	Hero	영웅	Ling-ling	Daejeon Arts Centre Art Hall	January 21–22	
2011	Hero	영웅	Ling-ling	Ansan Arts Center Sunrise Theater	January 29–30	
2011	Hero	영웅	Ling-ling	Changwon Seongsan Art Hall Grand Theater	February 26–27	
2011	Hero	영웅	Ling-ling	David H. Koch Theater	August 23 – September 4	
2012	Doctor Zhivago	닥터 지바고	Lara	Charlotte Theater	January 27 – June 3	
2012	Bungee Jump	번지점프를 하다	Tae-hee	Blue Square IMarket Hall	July 14 – September 2	
2012–2013	The Mirror Princess Pyeonggang Story	거울공주 평강이야기	Yeon-yi	Sh Art Hall	December 11 – March 31	
2013	Moon Embracing the Sun	해를 품은 달	Yeon-woo	Yongin Poeun Art Hall	June 8–23	
2013	Bungee Jump	번지점프를 하다	Tae-hee	Doosan Art Center	09.27–11.17	
2013–2014	Werther	베르테르	Charlotte	Seoul Arts Center, Towol Theater	December 3 – January 12	
2014–2015	Once	원스	Girl	Seoul Arts Center CJ Towol Theater	December 3 – March 29	
2015	10th Anniversary of Man of La Mancha	맨 오브 라만차	Aldonza	D Cube Art Center	July 30 – November 1	
2015	Maybe Happy Ending	어쩌면 해피엔딩	Claire	SeeYa Project Box	September 21–22	
2015–2016	15th Anniversary of Werther	베르테르	Charlotte	Seoul Arts Centre Opera House	November 10 – February 13	
2016	15th Anniversary of Werther	베르테르	Charlotte	Gyemyung Art Centre	January 15–17	
2016	15th Anniversary of Werther	베르테르	Charlotte	Busan Cultural Centre Grand Theatre	January 29–31	
2016	15th Anniversary of Werther	베르테르	Charlotte	Daejeon Arts Centre Art Hall	February 12–13	
2016	Sweeney Todd	스위니토드	Mrs. Lovett	Charlotte Theater	June 21 – October 3	
2016–2017	Maybe Happy Ending	어쩌면 해피엔딩	Claire	Daemyeong Cultural Factory	December 20 – March 5	
2017	Maybe Happy Ending	어쩌면 해피엔딩	Claire	Daemyeong Cultural Factory	Oct 23 – Nov 12	
2018	Doctor Zhivago	닥터 지바고	Lara	Charlotte Theater	Feb 27 – May 7	
2018	Il Tenore	일 테노레	Seo Jin-yeon	Wooran Cultural Foundation	December 3	
2019	Paris Bakery	빠리빵집	Miyeon	Wooran Cultural Foundation	January 12–14	
2020	Maybe Happy Ending	어쩌면 해피엔딩	Claire	Yes 24 Stage 1	June 30 – Sep 13	
2022–2023	Sweeney Todd	스위니토드	Mrs. Lovett	Charlotte Theater	Dec 1 – Mar 5	
2025	25th Anniversary of Werther	베르테르	Charlotte	DCube Link Art Center	Jan 17 – Mar 16	
2025	10th Anniversary of Maybe Happy Ending	어쩌면 해피엔딩	Claire	Doosan Art Center Yeongang Hall	October 30 – November 23	
2026	10th Anniversary National Tour of Maybe Happy Ending	어쩌면 해피엔딩	Claire	16-city national tour	Feb 1 – Jun 14	
2026–2027	10th Anniversary of Sweeney Todd	스위니토드	Mrs. Lovett	DCube Link Art Center	Dec 4 – May 2	

== Discography ==
=== Singles ===
Year	Title	Artist(s)	Notes	Ref.
2020	"Violet Fragrance"	Jeon Mi-do	Digital single	
2021	"Stay"	John Park and Jeon Mi-do	Collaborative digital single	

=== Cast recording ===
Year	Song title	Album	Notes
2012	"Have You Ever Heard" (혹시, 들은적 있니)	Bungee Jump cast recording	
2012	"Act 1 Finale"	Bungee Jump cast recording	with Kang Pil-seok and Lee Jae-kyun
2012	"That's My Everything" (그게 나의 전부란 걸)	Bungee Jump cast recording	with Kang Pil-seok and Yoon So-ho
2015	"The Legend of Magnet Mountain" (자석산의 전설)	Werther cast recording	with Song Na-young
2015	"We Are" (우리는)	Werther cast recording	with Cho Seung-woo
2015	"One Thousand Years" (하룻밤이 천년)	Werther cast recording	with Cho Seung-woo
2015	"My Sweet Love" (반가운 나의 사랑)	Werther cast recording	with Cho Seung-woo and Moon Jong-won
2015	"If You Can't Take a Step" (발길을 뗄 수 없으면)	Werther cast recording	with Moon Jong-won
2015	"Like a Sting of Lightning" (번갯불에 쏘인 것처럼)	Werther cast recording	with Cho Seung-woo
2015	"God" (하나님)	Werther cast recording	
2015	"Not Too Much" (다만 지나치지 않게)	Werther cast recording	with Cho Seung-woo
2015	"My Sinister Heart" (불길한 내 마음)	Werther cast recording	
2017	"I'm Going to See You" (만나러 갈 거예요)	Maybe Happy Ending cast recording	with Kim Jae-bum
2017	"Fireflies and Jeju Island" (반딧불, 그리고 제주도)	Maybe Happy Ending cast recording	with Jung Moon-sung
2017	"Goodbye, My Room"	Maybe Happy Ending cast recording	with Jung Wook-jin
2017	"We Walked the Streets in the Rain With Umbrellas" (우린 우산을 나눠쓴 채 그 빗속의 거리를 걸었어)	Maybe Happy Ending cast recording	with Kim Jae-bum
2017	"My Favorite Love Story"	Maybe Happy Ending cast recording	with Kim Jae-bum
2017	"More Than You Think" (생각보다, 생각만큼)	Maybe Happy Ending cast recording	
2017	"What People Have Learned" (사람들로부터 배운 것)	Maybe Happy Ending cast recording	
2017	"Love Is" (사랑이란)	Maybe Happy Ending cast recording	with Jung Wook-jin
2017	"Sorry, I Couldn't Keep My Promise" (미안, 나 약속 못 지켰어)	Maybe Happy Ending cast recording	with Jung Wook-jin
2017	"Nevertheless" (그럼에도 불구하고)	Maybe Happy Ending cast recording	with Kim Jae-bum
2017	"I'm Afraid I'll Leave the Flowerpot in the Window Too Long" (화분, 화분 다시 창가에 너무 오래 놔둘까 봐 걱정돼서)	Maybe Happy Ending cast recording	
2017	"You Can Just Remember That" (그것만은 기억해도 돼)	Maybe Happy Ending cast recording	with Jung Moon-sung
2017	"Thank You For Knocking on My Door" (내 문을 두드려줘서 고마웠어")	Maybe Happy Ending cast recording	with Jung Moon-sung
2017	"With Love, Maybe" (사랑이란, 어쩌면)	Maybe Happy Ending cast recording	with Jung Wook-jin
2017	"Nevertheless (Single ver.)" (그럼에도 불구하고)	Maybe Happy Ending cast recording	with Jung Wook-jin
2018	"When the Music Played"	Doctor Zhivago cast recording	
2018	"Now"	Doctor Zhivago cast recording	with Park Eun-tae
2018	"On the Edge of Time"	Doctor Zhivago cast recording	with Park Eun-tae

=== Soundtrack appearances ===
Title	Year	Peak chart positions			Album
Title	Year	KOR	KOR Hot	US World	Album
Television
"I Knew I Love" (사랑하게 될 줄 알았어)	2020	1	2	—	Hospital Playlist OST
"Oh! What a Shiny Night (Drama. Ver)" (밤이 깊었네) (Note: Performed with Jo Jung-suk, Yoo Yeon-seok, Jung Kyung-ho and Kim Dae-myung, and released under the band name Mido & Falasol.)	2020	37	24	—	Hospital Playlist OST
"Canon (Drama. Ver)" (캐논)	2020	194	—	—	Hospital Playlist OST
"Me to You, You to Me" (너에게 난, 나에게 넌)	2020	6	5	20	Hospital Playlist OST
"Butterfly"	2021	32	—	—	Hospital Playlist OST
"Someday" (언젠가는)	2021	85	—	—	Hospital Playlist OST
"The Wind Blows" (바람이 분다)	2024	—	—	—	Connection OST Part 2
"아마추어 (Amateur)" (캐논)	2025	—	—	—	Resident Playbook OST Part 4
"언젠가 눈부시게 빛날 테니 (언눈빛)" (캐논)	2025	—	—	—	Resident Playbook OST Part 8
Movie
"Friend" (벗)	2026	—	—	—	The King's Warden OST
"—" denotes releases that did not chart or were not released in that region.

=== Audiobooks ===
Year	Title	Role	Notes	Ref.
2026	Pilsa, Eoreuni Doeneun Sigan	Narrator	Talent-donation audiobook released by Willa	

== Accolades ==
=== Awards and nominations ===
Name of the award ceremony, year presented, category, nominee of the award, and the result of the nomination
Award ceremony	Year	Category	Nominee / Work	Result	Ref.
APAN Star Awards	2021	Best New Actress	Hospital Playlist	Won	
APAN Star Awards	2021	Popular Star Award, Actress	Hospital Playlist	Nominated	
Asia Artist Awards	2020	Best Acting Award	Hospital Playlist	Won	
Asia Contents Awards	2020	Newcomer Actress	Hospital Playlist	Won	
Asia Model Awards	2020	Rising Star Award	Jeon Mi-do	Won	
Baeksang Arts Awards	2020	Best New Actress – Television	Hospital Playlist	Nominated	
Baeksang Arts Awards	2026	Best Supporting Actress – Film	The King's Warden	Nominated	
Blue Dragon Film Awards	2026	Best Supporting Actress	The King's Warden	Pending	
Brand Customer Loyalty Awards (Note: Brand Customer Loyalty Awards is annual event which selects and awards the most influential brands in society and popular culture, determined through national consumer surveys. It is organized by the Korea Consumer Forum and Brand Keys, a top 10 American brand consulting organization.)	2026	Actress (Film)	Jeon Mi-do	Won	
Brand of the Year Awards	2020	Best New Actress	Hospital Playlist	Won	
Buil Film Awards	2026	Best Supporting Actress	The King's Warden	Nominated	
Buil Film Awards	2026	Star of the Year Award (Female)	The King's Warden	Won	
Director's Cut Awards	2026	Best Actress (Film)	The King's Warden	Nominated	
Director's Cut Awards	2026	Best New Actress (Film)	The King's Warden	Nominated	
Golden Ticket Awards	2023	Best Actress in a Musical	Sweeney Todd	Nominated	
Korea First Brand Award	2022	Best Actress	Jeon Mi-do	Won	
Korea Musical Awards	2012	Best Actress	Doctor Zhivago	Nominated	
Korea Musical Awards	2017	Best Actress	Sweeney Todd	Won	
Korea Musical Awards	2018	Best Actress	Maybe Happy Ending	Won	
Korea Musical Awards	2019	Best Actress	Doctor Zhivago	Nominated	
Korean Drama Awards	2008	Rookie of the Year Award	Agnes of God	Won	
Melon Music Awards	2020	Best OST	"I Knew I Love"	Nominated	
The Musical Awards	2015	Best Actress	Once	Won	
SBS Drama Awards	2025	Best Acting Award in the Miniseries Genre/Action category	Connection	Won	
Seoul Music Awards	2020	Best OST	"I Knew I Love"	Nominated	
Stage Talk Audience's Choice Awards (SACA)	2016	Best Actress Theater	Rain BEA	Won	
Stage Talk Audience's Choice Awards (SACA)	2016	Best Actress Musical	Sweeney Todd	Nominated	
Stage Talk Audience's Choice Awards (SACA)	2017	Best Actress Musical	Maybe Happy Ending	Won	
Stage Talk Audience's Choice Awards (SACA)	2018	Best Actress Theater	Oslo	Won	
Yegreen Musical Awards	2017	Women Popularity Award	Maybe Happy Ending	Won	

=== State honors ===
Name of country, year given, and name of honor
Country	Ceremony	Year	Honor Or Award	Ref.
South Korea	Korean Popular Culture and Arts Awards (Note: Honors are given at the Korean Popular Culture and Arts Awards, arranged by the Korea Creative Content Agency and hosted by the Ministry of Culture, Sports and Tourism. They are awarded to those who have contributed to the arts and South Korea's pop culture.)	2022	Minister of Culture, Sports and Tourism Commendation	
South Korea	Newsis K-Expo Cultural Awards (Note: Established in 2019 and co-sponsored by Korea's Ministry of Culture, Sports and Tourism, Ministry of Foreign Affairs, Korea Creative Content Agency, Seoul Metropolitan Council and the Seoul Tourism Organization, it awards cultural icons, businesses, and individuals who have contributed greatly to Hallyu, the Korean wave.)	2021	Seoul City Council President's Award	

=== Listicles ===
Name of publisher, year listed, name of listicle, and placement
Publisher	Year	Listicle	Placement	Ref.
Baeksang Arts Awards and Korea Musical Association	2026	Powerhouse 60 in Musical – Actors	Included	
Forbes Korea	2022	Korea Power Celebrity	27th	
Stage Talk	2014	Best Stage of the Year – Category Theater Actress	1st	
