= A Little Pond =

- Movie poster for A Little Pond
- Hangul: 작은 연못
- RR: Jageun yeonmot
- MR: Chagŭn yŏnmot
- Directed by: Yi Sang-woo
- Written by: Lee Saang-woo
- Produced by: Lee Eun; Lee Woo-jung
- Cinematography: Choi Jin-woong
- Edited by: Jang Sung-ho
- Music by: Bang Jun-seok
- Release dates: October 12, 2009 (Busan); April 15, 2010 (South Korean)
- Running time: 86 minutes
- Country: South Korea
- Language: Korean

A Little Pond (Korean: 작은 연못) is a 2009 South Korean feature film written and directed by Yi Sang-woo depicting the massacre of South Korean refugees by American soldiers at No Gun Ri in late July 1950, early in the Korean War. The ensemble cast, who donated their services, includes some of South Korea's leading actors.

== Plot ==
The plot draws on No Gun Ri victims' experiences, but the characters are all fictional. The film opens with scenes establishing the ordinary domestic rhythms of a midcentury Korean village, with children at play, men relaxing over a board game, and a young teacher leading her pupils in practice for a singing contest. But the fighting front of the war, which began several weeks earlier, soon intrudes as combat moves south.

The United States has hastily dispatched insufficiently trained troops from Japan to join the South Korean army in defending against North Korean invaders. As the defenders reel in retreat, American soldiers order the villagers to abandon their homes and head south. Some 500 begin the trek, with children on their backs and carts laden with belongings.

Rumors have spread among American soldiers that North Korean infiltrators are disguised among South Korean refugees. As the villagers struggle southward along a railroad track, they are suddenly attacked by American warplanes. Many are killed. In the ensuing chaos, U.S. soldiers force hundreds of survivors into the underpass of a railroad bridge, and receive orders to fire on them, despite one soldier's communication to his superiors that they are only civilians. Over the next three days, in heart-wrenching scenes of carnage, most of the refugees are killed. The few survivors, mostly children, emerge from under piles of bodies as the Americans retreat and advancing North Korean soldiers discover the gruesome scene. (Survivors estimated 400 people were killed.)

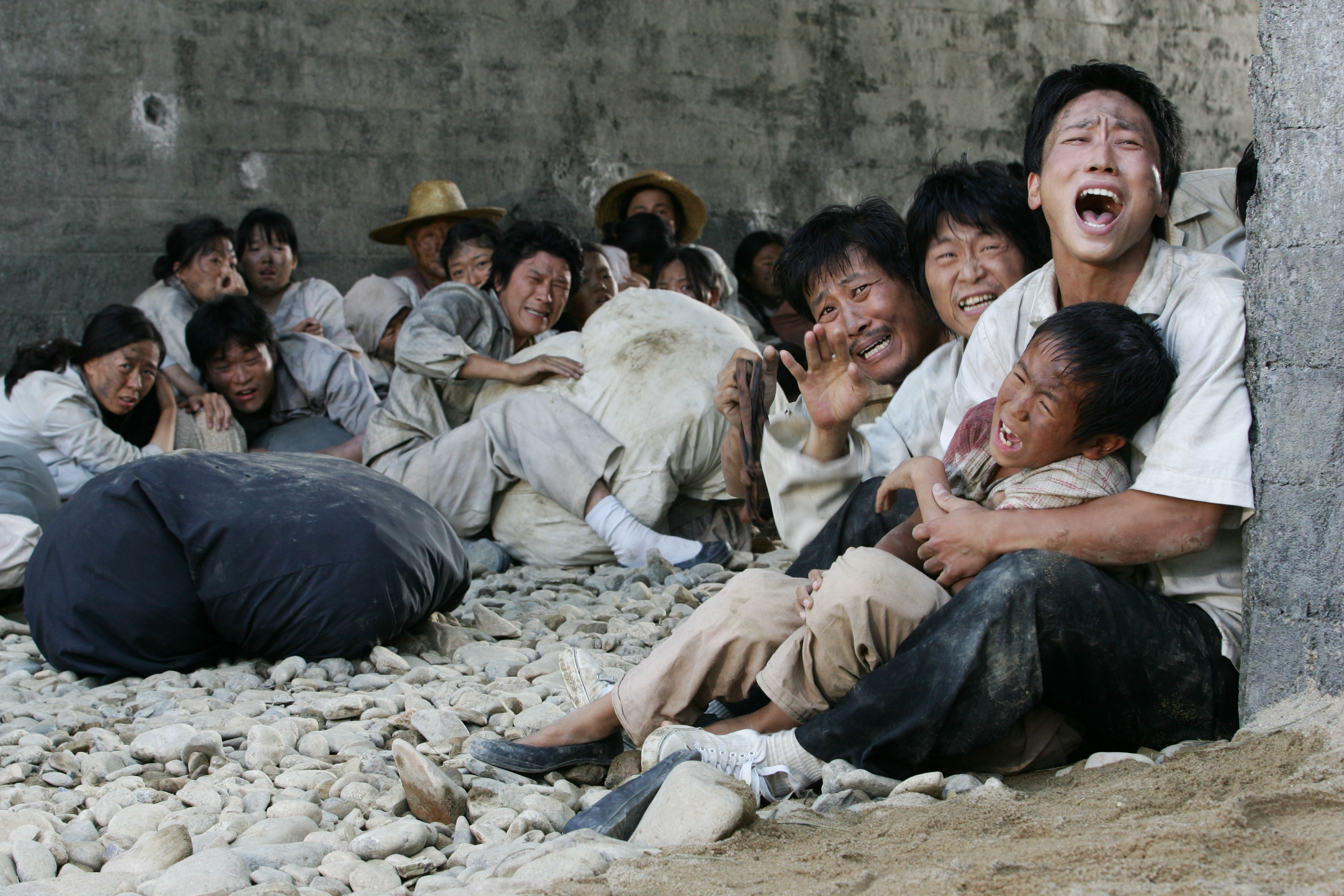
A depiction of the scene under the No Gun Ri bridge. The U.S. military killed a large number of South Korean refugees under and around the bridge in July 1950.

In the denouement, survivors and villagers who were never trapped under the bridge return to their homes as the tides of war ebb and flow. One of the last is a boy, assumed dead by his mother, who has carried his small sister on his back for miles from their southern refuge. As the credits roll, A Little Pond ends with a kind of dream sequence in which children and villagers brought back to life sing and applaud the contest theme song they never performed.

== Production ==
After reading the 2003 Korean translation of The Bridge at No Gun Ri, a book by Charles J. Hanley, Sang-Hun Choe and Martha Mendoza, Associated Press journalists who confirmed the massacre, executive producer Lee Eun of Myung Films was determined to tell the story on the screen. Additional background came from Do You Know Our Sorrow?, a 1994 Korean-language book by Chung Eun-yong, whose two children were killed at No Gun Ri.

Noted theater director Yi Sang-woo joined the project, directing his first film. He and producer Lee Woo-jung spent three years collecting material through interviews with No Gun Ri survivors and other sources. Lee Eun formed an autonomous unit, Nogunri Production, in May 2006 to produce the movie, and the team recruited such leading actors as Song Kang-ho (of Thirst and The Host) and Moon So-ri (Oasis and A Good Lawyer's Wife). Because the story's controversial nature discouraged investors, many of the cast and crew donated their services, some even bringing family members along to play villager roles when the three months of filming began in August 2006. "I'll take pride in myself for a long time for taking part in this film," actor Kim Roi-ha told a reporter. Director Lee chose as the movie's title the name of a highly popular South Korean political protest song of the 1980s.

A long post-production period ended in March 2009, and the film premiered on Oct. 8, 2009, at the 14th Busan International Film Festival in Busan, South Korea.

== Cast ==
- Shin Myung-cheol as Jiang
- Jeon Hye-jin as Jiang's mother
- Park Chae Yeun as Jiang's little sister
- Kim Ji Ho as Jiang's aunt's daughter
- Park Hee-jin as Ji-ni
- Lee Dae-yeon as Jiang's uncle
- Park Ji-a as Jjang-i's aunt
- Kim Eui-jin as Jaya
- Choi Jong-ryul as Jaya's grandfather
- Kim Seung-wook as Jaya's father
- Lee Seung-bi as Jaya's mother
- Son Hyung-soo as Gae-bi (Gaby)
- Kim Roi-ha as Gae-bi's father
- Jung Sung-hoon as Kooli
- Lee Sung-min as Kooli's father
- Kim Duk-eun as Kooli's mother
- Moon Sung-keun as Mr. Moon
- Choi Deok-moon as Byung-do
- Kim Ji-hyun as Hyun
- Min Sung-wook as Wook
- Kim Doo-yong as Mr. Kim
- Min Bok-ki as Mr. Min
- Lee Hwa-jin as Mr. Min's wife
- Min Jung-ki as Mr. Min's father
- Kim Se-dong as Mr. Kim
- Seo Dong-gab as Mr. Seo
- Park Kwang-jung as Mr. Park
- Kim Jung-young as Mr. Park's wife
- Kang Shin-il as Mr. Kang
- Hwang Mi-sun as Mr. Kang's wife
- Song Kang-ho as Police officer (special appearance)
- Moon So-ri as Refugee (special appearance)

== Release ==
The film was shown at the following film festivals:

- 2009 (14th) Busan International Film Festival—gala presentation, October 8 (world premiere)
- 2010 (9th) New York Asian Film Festival—June 25-July 8
- 2010 (14th) Fantasia Film Festival, Montreal—July 8–28
- 2010 (5th) London Korean Film Festival—November 5–23

== Reception ==
A Little Pond won no awards at its debut festival in Busan. Upon commercial release in South Korea, The Korea Herald commented that the film "got a lukewarm response from the local press and movie critics." In North America, Variety described it as "direct, uncomplicated and incredibly moving," and the Montreal Gazette as a "brave, handsomely mounted film." At the BeyondHollywood website, British reviewer James Mudge called A Little Pond an "admirable, if gruelling effort to bring more attention to a truly appalling incident. ... a sterling piece of work."
