= Yi Sang-woo =

South Korean film director, screenwriter and actor

- 이상우
- Born: 10 October 1951 (age 75); South Korea
- Other name: Lee Sang-woo
- Education: Seoul National University – Department of Aesthetics
- Occupations: Film director; Theater director; Screenwriter; Playwright
- Years active: 1978–present

Korean name
- Hangul: 이상우
- Hanja: 李相宇
- RR: I Sangu
- MR: I Sangu

Yi Sang-woo (Korean: 이상우; born 10 October 1951) is a South Korean film director, screenwriter, and actor. He earned his degree in the Department of Aesthetics at Seoul National University. In 1977, he played a key role in establishing the Yeonwoo Stage theater company and founded the Chaimu Theater Company in 1995. He served as CEO of Chaimu until 2002, when he was succeeded by Min Bok-ki. Yi is also an associate professor in the Directing Department at the Korea National University of Arts, where he previously served as director until his retirement in 2018.

Since 1978, Yi has directed a wide range of plays, including The Sculptor and the Detective, Unification Express, The Tale of a Thief, Pig Hunt, No Words, The Tale of Tail Cotton, Mae of Cape Jangsan, Chilsu and Mansu and Balsam Flower Water. He also worked on adaptations such as Changes, Korea Fantasy and There, as well as directed translations of plays like The Pitmen Painters, Almost, Maine, Love, Love, Love and The Cosmonaut's Last Message to the Woman He Once Loved in the Former Soviet Union. In addition to his theater work, he has written screenplays and directed films, including A Little Pond.

== Career ==
=== Theater troupe Yeonwoo ===
In 1977, three alumni of the Seoul National University theater club, Yi (class of '70), Jung Han-ryong (class of '64) and Kim Kwang-rim (class of '71), worked together at the same company, OriCom after graduation. They decided to establish a theater company together and named it "Yeonwoo" (演友), which signifies "friends who love theater". The parents of the four founders were from Hamgyeong Province. Later, dental surgeon Oh Jong-woo, Lee Young-hoon, the director of the Gyeongju National Museum and Cho Woo-hyun, a professor at Inha University, joined the group. They were also alumni of the Seoul National University theater club.

In 1978, he made his directorial debut with the play The Sculptor and the Detective. He has directed a wide range of plays, including The Tale of a Thief, Mae of Cape Jangsan, Chilsu and Mansu and Balsam Flower Water.

In 1987, he directed the play Chilsu and Mansu. He won a Directing Award from The 23rd Dong-A Theater Awards and the 23rd Baeksang Arts Awards.

=== Theater troupe Chaimu ===
In 1995, the Chaimu theater group was founded by Yi with founding members including Kim Gwang-rim, Kim Seok-man and Jung Han-ryong. The group includes notable actors such as Moon Sung-keun, Yoo Oh-sung and Song Kang-ho. The troupe's name, "Chaimu", means "dimensional movement stage".

Their inaugural production, Playland, was held from September 8 to October 8 at Hakjeon Blue Theater. It is based on Adol Hugard's altered worldview, aiming to resolve racial tensions between black and white races and to heal the shattered human soul through genuine confessions between the two. Moon Sung-keun, who had been mostly active in movies and TV, took the role of Gide and returned to the theater stage after three years. Ryu Tae-ho, a young theater actor concurrently filming the movie Porn Man, portrayed the character Marty.

The group's members include actors such as Kang Shin-il, Lee Dae-yeon, Lee Sung-min, Choi Duk-moon and Jeon Hye-jin, who have worked across film, television and theater. The group is known for producing stage adaptations based on realistic themes and has built an extensive repertoire through its theatrical production.

The five representative works of Chaimu exemplify its distinctive features. Some of these works have been performed for 25 years since their premiere, yet they continue to resonate with audiences through their diverse narratives.

=== Film Director debut ===
In 2009, Yi Sang-woo's first film as director, A Little Pond, was released. It is a historical film that exposes the massacre of civilians in Nogeun-ri during the Korean War, when American soldiers killed South Koreans who were seeking refuge. Yi Sang-woo initially planned the project as a documentary but later changed it into a feature film due to insufficient investment. The film was completed after an extensive production period of eight years, including four years of on-site research. Its most significant achievement lies in its realistic portrayal of the long-suppressed Nogeun-ri incident.

Unlike typical war films, A Little Pond treats all characters as main characters without a specific protagonist. Notably, theater actors such as Moon Seong-geun, Kang Shin-il, Lee Dae-yeon and Park Gwang-jeong participated in the film out of their commitment to its significance, appearing without any guarantee. It received high praise for its authentic depiction of a hidden historical event, but it also faced criticism for its perceived lack of cinematic quality.

== Filmography ==
=== Film ===
Film credit
Year	Title		Credited as		Ref.
Year	English	Korean	Scriptwriter	Director	Ref.
1988	Chil-su and Man-su	칠수와 만수	Yi Sang-woo	Park Kwang-soo	
1994	Out to the World	세상 밖으로	Yi Sang-woo	Yeo Kyun-Dong	
1995	Sunset Into the Neon Lights	네온 속으로 노을지다	Yi Sang-woo	Lee Hyun-seung	
1998	Film-making	죽이는 이야기	Yi Sang-woo	Yeo Kyun-Dong	
2000	La Belle	미인	Yi Sang-woo	Yeo Kyun-Dong	
2010	A Little Pond	작은 연못	Yi Sang-woo	Yi Sang-woo	

== Theater ==
=== Musical and Opera ===
Musical works of Yi
Year	Title		Credited as				Ref.
Year	English	Korean	Translation	Adaptation	Playwright	Director	Ref.
1979	Opera: Marriage	결혼	—N/a	—N/a	Yi Sang-woo	Yi Sang-woo	
1995	Musical: "I Will Become a Star,"	뮤지컬 '스타가 될꺼야'	—N/a	—N/a	Yi Sang-woo	Yi Sang-woo	

=== Theater ===
Theater works of Yi
Year	Title		Credited as				Ref.
Year	English	Korean	Translation	Adaptation	Playwright	Director	Ref.
1978	The Sculptor and the Detective	조각가와 탐정	—N/a	—N/a	Oh Jong-woo	Yi Sang-woo	
1979	Our Afterlife	우리들의 저승	—N/a	—N/a	Kim Kwang-rim	Yi Sang-woo	
1980	Ma at Jangsan Pass (Note: adapted by Lee Sang-woo from the original novel by Hwang Seok-young)	장산곶 매	—N/a	Yi Sang-woo	—N/a	Yi Sang-woo	
1981	Children of Darkness (Note: adapted from the original work by Lee Cheol-yong)	어둠의 자식들	—N/a	Yi Sang-woo	—N/a	Yi Sang-woo	
1986	Chilsu and Mansu (Note: adapted, based on the original work by Hwang Chun-myeong)	칠수와 만수	—N/a	Yi Sang-woo, Oh Jong-Woo	—N/a	Yi Sang-woo	
1989	The Story of an Old Thief	늙은 도둑 이야기	—N/a	—N/a	Yi Sang-woo	Yi Sang-woo	
1990	Bosunga Flower Water (Note: adapted from the original novel by Kim Min-sook)	봉숭이 꽃물	—N/a	Yi Sang-woo	—N/a	Yi Sang-woo	
1992	Cooney Country - Wonderland (Note: adapted by Lee Sang-woo from the original work by Bertolt Brecht)	쿠니 나라 - 이상한 나라	—N/a	Yi Sang-woo	Bertolt Brecht	Yi Sang-woo	
1994	April 9	4월9일	—N/a	—N/a	Yi Sang-woo	Yi Sang-woo	
1994	Apartment's Leucistrate - Let's unify men and women (Note: adapted by Lee Sang-woo from the original work by Aristophanes)	아파트의 류씨스트라테 - 남녀통일합시다	Yi Sang-Woo	—N/a	Aristophanes	Yi Sang-woo	
1995	Playland (Note: translated based on the work by Adol Hugard)	플레이랜드	Yi Sang-Woo	—N/a	Athol Fugard	Yi Sang-woo	
1996	The Dwarf Shoots a Small Ball (Note: adapted from the original work by Jo Se-hee)	난장이가 쏘아올린 작은 공	—N/a	Yi Sang-woo	Jo Se-hee	Yi Sang-woo	
1996	Be Unspoken	비언소	—N/a	—N/a	Yi Sang-woo	Yi Sang-woo, Park Gwang-jeong	
1997	Peace (Note: adapted by Lee Sang-woo from the original work by Aristophanes)	평화 씨	Yi Sang-Woo	—N/a	Aristophanes	Yi Sang-woo	
1997	Fish Man	물고기 남자	—N/a	—N/a	Lee Kang-baek	Yi Sang-woo	
1998	Moral thief	도덕적 도둑	—N/a	—N/a	Yi Sang-Woo	Yi Sang-woo	
1999	Unification Express	통일 익스프레스	—N/a	—N/a	Oh Tae-young	Yi Sang-woo	
2000	Korea Fantasy	마르고 닳도록	—N/a	—N/a	Lee Kang-baek	Yi Sang-woo	
2003	Pig Hunting	돼지 사냥	—N/a	—N/a	Yi Sang-woo	Min Bok-ki	
2007	Change	변	—N/a	—N/a	Hwang Ji-woo, Yi Sang-woo	Yi Sang-woo	
2010	The Pitmen Painters	광부화가들	Yi Sang-Woo	—N/a	Lee Hall	Yi Sang-woo	
2010–2011	Almost, Maine	올모스트 메인	Yi Sang-Woo	—N/a	John Cariani	Yi Sang-woo	
2013	Love, Love, Love	러브 러브 러브	Yi Sang-Woo	—N/a	Mike Bartlett	Yi Sang-woo	
2014	The Cosmonaut's Last Message to the Woman He Once Loved in the Former Soviet Union	한때 사랑했던 여자에게 보내는 구소련 우주비행사의 마지막 메시지	—N/a	—N/a	David Greig	Yi Sang-woo	
2016	Twenty Twenty Chaimu - Tail Cotton Story	스물스물 차이무 - 꼬리솜 이야기	—N/a	—N/a	Yi Sang-Woo	Yi Sang-woo	
2016	That place - 2016 Series theatre full (滿員) - Seongnam	거기-2016 시리즈 연극 만원(滿員) - 성남	Seong Su-jeong	Yi Sang-woo (Note: adapted by Lee Sang-woo from the original work by Conor McPherson)	Conor McPherson	Yi Sang-woo	

== Awards and nominations ==
Year	Award	Category	Nominated work	Result	Ref.
1987	23rd Dong-A Theatre Awards	Best Director	Chilsu and Mansu	Won	
1987	23rd Baeksang Arts Awards	Best Director — Theater	Chilsu and Mansu	Won	
1995	The 1st Korea Musical Awards	Play of the Year Award	I Will Become a Star	Won	
1998	Korea Theater Association Award	Best Director — Theater	Moral Thief	Won	
1999	Korean Theater Association	Play of the Year Award	Unification Express	Top 5	
2000	Korean Theater Association Award	Best Director	Korea Fantasy	Won	
2002	3rd Kim Sang-ryeol Theater Award	Theater Award	Yi Sang-Woo	Won	
2002	Korea Theater Critics Association	Play of the Year Award	There	Top 3	
2002	Korean Theater Association Award	Play of the Year Award	There	Top 7	
