= Thirty-Nine =

2022 South Korean television drama series

- Promotional poster
- Hangul: 서른, 아홉
- Lit.: Thirty, Nine
- RR: Seoreun, ahop
- MR: Sŏrŭn, ahop
- Created by: JTBC
- Written by: Yoo Yeong-ah
- Directed by: Kim Sang-ho
- Starring: Son Ye-jin; Jeon Mi-do; Kim Ji-hyun
- Music by: Gwon Young-chan
- Country of origin: South Korea
- Original language: Korean
- No. of episodes: 12

Production
- Producers: Choi Byung-hwan; Jeong Gyeong-jae; Kim Se-ah
- Cinematography: Lee Hyun; Hwang Tae-joon
- Editors: Yoo Hyun-hye; Jo Hye-sol
- Running time: 70–80 minutes
- Production companies: Lotte Cultureworks; JTBC Studios

Original release
- Network: JTBC
- Release: February 16 – March 31, 2022

Thirty-Nine (Korean: 서른, 아홉; RR: Seoreun, ahop) is a 2022 South Korean television series directed by Kim Sang-ho and starring Son Ye-jin, Jeon Mi-do, and Kim Ji-hyun. The series remake of Chinese Drama Nothing But Thirty revolves around the life, friendship, romances, and love of three friends who are about to turn forty. It premiered on JTBC on February 16, 2022, and aired every Wednesday and Thursday at 22:30 (KST) for 12 episodes. It is available for streaming on Netflix.

The last episode of the series logged its highest ratings national wide: of 8.1%. Additionally, it was listed for four weeks in the Global Top 10 weekly list of the most-watched international Netflix TV shows as of April 3.

== Cast and characters ==
=== Main ===
- Son Ye-jin as Cha Mi-jo, 39 years old, physician and director of Gangnam Dermatology Clinic.
  - Shin So-hyun as young Cha Mi-jo.
- Jeon Mi-do as Jeong Chan-young, 39 years old, a drama coach.
  - Ha Seon-ho as young Jeong Chan-young.
- Kim Ji-hyun as Jang Joo-hee, 39 years old, a cosmetics saleswoman at a department store.
  - Lee Da-yeon as young Jang Joo-hee.

=== Supporting ===
- Yeon Woo-jin as Kim Seon-woo, a 39-year-old dermatologist.
- Lee Moo-saeng as Kim Jin-seok, a 42-year-old talent agent.
- Lee Tae-hwan as Park Hyun-joon, a 35-year-old chef and owner of a Chinatown restaurant.
- Ahn So-hee as Kim So-won, younger sister of Kim Seon-woo, and a pianist.

==== People around Cha Mi-jo ====
- Lee Kan-hee as Mi-jo's mother.
- Kang Mal-geum as Cha Mi-hyun, 44 years old, Mi-jo's older sister, administrator of their clinic.
  - Yoon Hye-bin as young Cha Mi-hyun.
- Park Ji-il as Professor Cha Yoo-hyeok, Mi-jo's father.

==== People around Jeong Chan-young ====
- Seo Hyun-chul as Chan-young's father.
- Lee Ji-hyun as Chan-young's mother.

==== People around Jang Joo-hee ====
- Nam Gi-ae as Joo-hee's mother.

==== Others ====
- Song Min-ji as Kang Seon-joo, 37 years old, Jinseok's wife. She is from a wealthy family and demands to have whatever she wants.
- Oh Se-young as Cho Hye-jin, 27 years old, a graduate student who is Hyun-jun's girlfriend.
- Jo Won-hee as Kim Jeong-tak, Kim Seon-woo's father and Kim So-won's adoptive father.
- Seo Ji-young as Lee Kyung-sook, Cha Mi-jo's biological mother.

=== Special appearance ===
- Kim Kwon as an Chan-young's acting student. (Ep. 1).
- Hwang Bo-reum-byeol as Chan-young's acting student. (Ep. 3).
- Han Soo-ah as Hye-jin's friend (Ep.4).
- Han Bo-reum as an acting student (Ep. 7).
- Im Si-wan as Im Siwan, lead actor in the film within the film, and a former student of Chan-young.
- Kang Tae-oh as Park Hyun-joon's friend.

== Production ==
=== Casting ===
In April 2021, it was announced that Son Ye-jin and Jeon Mi-do were in talks to appear inThirty-Nine, a 12-episode mini-series co-produced by Lotte Cultureworks and JTBC Studio. Son confirmed her appearance in June 2021, while Jeon and Kim Ji-hyun confirmed in August. Thirty-Nine marks Son's return to JTBC after three years; she last appeared in JTBC's 2018 TV series Something in the Rain.

=== Filming ===
Filming began in August 2021. On January 12, 2022, photos from the script reading were published.

== Original soundtrack ==
Thirty-Nine

Soundtrack album by Various
- Released: 2022
- Genre: Soundtrack
- Languages: Korean; English
- Labels: Kakao Entertainment; JTBC Studios

=== Part 1 ===
Released on February 16, 2022
| No. | Title | Lyrics | Music | Artist | Length |
|---|---|---|---|---|---|
| 1. | "Still Here" (그때 우리가) | Kwon Young-chan, Kang Ah-sol | Kwon Young-chan | Kang Ah-sol | 3:51 |
| 2. | "Still Here" (Inst.) | | Kwon Young-chan | | 3:51 |

=== Part 2 ===
Released on February 23, 2022
| No. | Title | Lyrics | Music | Artist | Length |
|---|---|---|---|---|---|
| 1. | "I Was a Fool" | Fromm | Fromm | Fromm | 2:58 |
| 2. | "I Was a Fool" (Inst.) | | | | 2:58 |

=== Part 3 ===
Released on March 3, 2022
| No. | Title | Lyrics | Music | Artist | Length |
|---|---|---|---|---|---|
| 1. | "That's All" (이것밖에) | Choi Yu-ree | Choi Yu-ree | Choi Yu-ree | 4:25 |
| 2. | "That's All" (Inst.) | | | | 4:25 |

=== Part 4 ===
Released on March 10, 2022
| No. | Title | Lyrics | Music | Artist | Length |
|---|---|---|---|---|---|
| 1. | "Peony" (꽃말) | Kwon Young-chan | Kwon Young-chan | Car, the Garden | 4:05 |
| 2. | "Peony" (Inst.) | | | | 4:05 |

=== Part 5 ===
Released on March 17, 2022
| No. | Title | Lyrics | Music | Artist | Length |
|---|---|---|---|---|---|
| 1. | "In your days" (너의 하루 끝에) | Song Yang-Ha, Kim Jae-hyun, Kyoi | Song Yang-Ha, Kim Jae-hyun, Kyoi, Kim Ha-jun | Wheein | 3:58 |
| 2. | "In your days" (Inst.) | | Song Yang-Ha, Kim Jae-hyun, Kyoi, Kim Ha-jun | | 3:58 |

=== Part 6 ===
Released on March 24, 2022
| No. | Title | Lyrics | Music | Artist | Length |
|---|---|---|---|---|---|
| 1. | "Did" (그랬을까) | Jung Joon-il | Jung Joon-il | Jung Joon-il | 3:49 |
| 2. | "Did" (Inst.) | | Jung Joon-il | | 3:49 |

== Viewership ==
Thirty-Nine : South Korea viewers per episode (millions)

| Season | Episode number | | | | | | | | | | | | Average |
| Season | 1 | 2 | 3 | 4 | 5 | 6 | 7 | 8 | 9 | 10 | 11 | 12 | Average |
|---|---|---|---|---|---|---|---|---|---|---|---|---|---|
| 1 | 1.052 | 1.193 | 1.623 | 1.614 | 1.086 | 1.401 | 1.210 | 1.520 | 1.379 | 1.546 | 1.314 | 1.714 | 1.387 |

Source: Audience measurement performed nationwide by Nielsen Korea

| Ep. | Broadcast date | Title | Average audience share (Nielsen Korea) | |
| Ep. | Broadcast date | Title | Nationwide | Seoul |
|---|---|---|---|---|
| 1 | February 16, 2022 | "Thirty, Nine" | 4.406% (3rd) | 4.453% (3rd) |
| 2 | February 17, 2022 | "One Absurd Day" | 5.076% (4th) | 5.410% (4th) |
| 3 | February 23, 2022 | "Something I Had Never Thought Of" | 7.414% (1st) | 7.806% (1st) |
| 4 | February 24, 2022 | "Choice" | 7.540% (1st) | 8.700% (1st) |
| 5 | March 2, 2022 | "Rachmaninoff Piano Concerto No. 2" | 5.537% (2nd) | 6.183% (2nd) |
| 6 | March 3, 2022 | "Conviction" | 6.945% (2nd) | 7.691% (1st) |
| 7 | March 16, 2022 (Note: Due to presidential election broadcast on March 9, the 7th episode aired on March 16. Instead, a special broadcast of episodes 1-6 aired on March 10 under the title of 'About thirty and nine'.) | "The Inconvenient Truth" | 5.708% (2nd) | 6.331% (1st) |
| 8 | March 17, 2022 | "When You Think It's the End" | 7.229% (1st) | 8.141% (1st) |
| 9 | March 23, 2022 | "Thousand Nights Over and Over Again" | 6.545% (1st) | 6.840% (1st) |
| 10 | March 24, 2022 | "He Who Dances Must Pay the Piper" | 7.130% (1st) | 7.343% (1st) |
| 11 | March 30, 2022 | "About Romance" | 6.417% (1st) | 7.051% (1st) |
| 12 | March 31, 2022 | "Samseong-dong, Hyochang-dong and Gocheok-dong" | 8.122% (1st) | 8.941% (1st) |
| Average | | | 6.506% | 7.074% |
| Special | March 10, 2022 | "About thirty and nine" | —N/a | |
In the table above, the blue numbers represent the lowest ratings and the red numbers represent the highest ratings.; This drama airs on a cable channel/pay TV which normally has a relatively smaller audience compared to free-to-air TV/public broadcasters (KBS, SBS, MBC and EBS).

== Awards and nominations ==
Name of the award ceremony, year presented, category, nominee of the award, and the result of the nomination
| Award ceremony | Year | Category | Nominee / Work | Result | Ref. |
|---|---|---|---|---|---|
| APAN Star Awards | 2022 | Best Supporting Actress | Kim Ji-hyun | Nominated | |
| Baeksang Arts Awards | 2022 | Best Supporting Actress | Kang Mal-geum | Nominated | |
| Bechdel Day | 2022 | Bechdel's Choice 5 | Thirty-Nine | Won | |
| Bechdel Day | 2022 | Best Writer | Yoo Young-ah | Won | |
