= Connection (TV series) =

2024 South Korean television series

- Promotional poster
- Hangul: 커넥션
- RR: Keoneksyeon
- MR: K'ŏneksyŏn
- Genre: Psychological; Crime; Police procedural; Thriller
- Written by: Lee Hyun
- Directed by: Kim Mun-kyo; Kwon Da-som
- Starring: Ji Sung; Jeon Mi-do; Kwon Yul; Kim Kyung-nam
- Music by: Kim Joon-seok; Jeong Se-rin
- Country of origin: South Korea
- Original language: Korean
- No. of episodes: 14

Production
- Executive producer: Lee Kwang-sun (CP)
- Producers: Han Jung-hwan; Jo Jae-yeon; Lee Soo-yeon; Park Sang-jin; Noh Jeon-gyu; Lee Tae-gon; Kim Si-hwan
- Cinematography: Kim Dong-young; Kang Joo-sin; Yeom Ho-wang; Jung Seung-hwan
- Editor: Jo In-hyung
- Running time: 70 minutes
- Production companies: Studio S; Good Wave, Inc.; Soul Pictures

Original release
- Network: SBS TV
- Release: May 24 – July 6, 2024

Connection (Korean: 커넥션) is a 2024 South Korean psychological crime police procedural thriller television series written by Lee Hyun, co-directed by Kim Moon-gyo and Kwon Da-som, and starring Ji Sung, Jeon Mi-do, Kwon Yul, and Kim Kyung-nam. It aired on SBS TV from May 24, to July 6, 2024, every Friday and Saturday at 22:00 (KST). It is also available for streaming on Wavve and Coupang Play in South Korea, on Vidio in Indonesia, and on Kocowa and Viki in selected regions.

== Synopsis ==
It is about the story of an ace detective from the narcotics team who, after being forcibly addicted to drugs by someone, uses the death of his friend as a clue to uncover the story of their 20-year-old altered friendship and the connection between them.

== Cast and characters ==
=== Main ===
- Ji Sung as Jang Jae-gyeong
  - Cho Han-gyeol as young Jang Jae-gyeong

A detective of Narcotics Team at Anhyeon Police Station, who is respected by his juniors and trusted by his seniors within the police force.

- Jeon Mi-do as Oh Yoon-jin
  - Kim Min-ju as young Oh Yoon-jin

A social affairs reporter of the Anhyeon Economic Daily, who is assertive and outspoken.

- Kwon Yul as Park Tae-jin
  - Baek Jae-woo as young Park Tae-jin

A prosecutor at Anhyeon District Office who was known as a child prodigy with a brilliant mind and gets entangled in a case involving his high school classmates Jae-gyeong and Yoon-jin.

- Kim Kyung-nam as Won Jong-soo
  - Park Si-yun as young Won Jong-soo

A second generation chaebol who holds some sort of power through a friendship that has continued since his school days. He is Keumhyung Group's successor and has tense confrontation with high school classmate Jae-gyeong.

=== Supporting ===
- Jeong Soon-won as Heo Joo-song
  - Jo Min-gu as young Heo Joo-song

CEO of Two Star Holdings, an insurance company, who is talkative and weak-hearted and is in love to Yoon-jin.

- Jung Yoo-min as Choi Ji-yeon

A mysterious person who not only finds herself alone due to the sudden death of her husband Jun-seo, but also discovers that she is not the beneficiary of 5 billion won in insurance money.

- Yoon Na-moo as Park Jun-seo
  - Lee Hyun-so as young Park Jun-seo

President of Pil O Real Estate who was a close friend of Jae-gyeong when they were in high school.

- Moon Sung-keun as Won Chang-ho

Chairman of the Keumhyung Group and Jong-soo's father.

- Cha Yup as Oh Chi-hyun
  - Choi Min-suk as young Oh Chi-hyun

A fighter from Anhyeon City High School and values loyalty more than life. He is Jong-soo's chief secretary.

- Lee Gang-wook as Jeong Yoon-ho
  - Kim Je-hun as young Jeong Yoon-ho

A taxi driver who is part of the 'Inner Circle' led by Jong-soo and Si-jung's husband.

- Park Geun-rok as Jeong Sang-eui
  - Bae Jun-hyung as young Jeong Sang-eui

A researcher at Keumhyung Pharmaceutical.

- Yoon Sa-bong as Jung Yeon-joo

Captain of Narcotics Team at Anhyeon Police Station.

- Jung Jae-kwang as Kim Chang-soo

A detective of Narcotics Team at Anhyeon Police Station and Jae-gyeong trusted right-hand man.

- Park Jung-pyo as Yoo Kyung-hwan

A detective of Violent Crimes Team at Anhyeon Police Station and has an antagonistic relationship with Yeon-joo.

- Yoo Hee-je as Gong Jin-wook

A mystery person who is related to Jae-gyeong's drug addiction.

- Baek Ji-won as CEO Yoon

A member of a drug gang who deals and distributes the Lemon Mulberry pills in Anhyeon City.

=== Others ===
- Seo Yi-ra as Oh Soo-hyun

The youngest detective of Narcotics Team at Anhyeon Police Station under Jae-gyeong.

- Lee Sang-jun as Kim Woo-sung

A junior reporter at Anhyeon Economic Daily who is Yoon-jin's junior.

- Ryu Hye-rin as Kang Si-jung

Yoon-ho's wife and an Anhyeon City High School alumni.

- Han Hyeon-jun as Min Hyun-woo

A high school student who helps Jun-seo in delivering pharmaceutical drugs.

- Kim Min-sik as Park In-soo

A detective of Violent Crimes Team at Anhyeon Police Station.

- Byun Hyo-joon as Min Jung-guk

A detective of Violent Crimes Team at Anhyeon Police Station.

- Oh Il-young as Lee Myung-guk

A senior researcher at Keumhyung Pharmaceutical.

- Park Chan-woo as No Gyu-min
  - Ahn Do-gyu as teen No Gyu-min

A taxi driver who is Chae Kyung-tae's friend in high school days.

=== Special appearances ===
- Jang Hyuk-jin as Hwang Hong-suk
- Lee Chang-hun as a corporate PR staff

== Production ==
=== Development ===
Director Kim Mun-kyo, who worked on Trolley (2023), and writer Lee Hyun, who worked on Diary of a Prosecutor (2019), are in charge of the directing and writing of the series. Studio S, Soul Pictures, and Good Wave, Inc. managed the production.

=== Casting ===
Ji Sung and Jeon Mi-do were confirmed to star for the series. This is their first time working together on a project. It is also Ji's comeback on SBS since Doctor John in 2019 and it was Jeon's first lead drama in a terrestrial channel since debuting as an actor in 2006.

== Release ==
Connection was announced to air on SBS TV in the first half of 2024. A special teaser of the series was released on December 29, 2023. SBS' production team confirmed that the series would air on May 24, 2024, every Friday and Saturday at 22:00 (KST). It is also available to stream on Wavve, Coupang Play, Kocowa and Vidio.

== Viewership ==
Connection : South Korea viewers per episode (millions)

Season	Episode number														Average
Season	1	2	3	4	5	6	7	8	9	10	11	12	13	14	Average
1	1.038	1.090	1.288	1.432	1.507	1.665	1.619	1.649	1.650	2.039	1.735	1.952	1.859	2.560	1.649

Source: Audience measurement performed nationwide by Nielsen Korea.

Average TV viewership ratings
Ep.	Original broadcast date	Average audience share (Nielsen Korea)	
Ep.	Original broadcast date	Nationwide	Seoul
1	May 24, 2024	5.7% (7th)	6.1% (3rd)
2	May 25, 2024	6.1% (2nd)	7.0% (2nd)
3	May 31, 2024	7.0% (4th)	6.7% (3rd)
4	June 1, 2024	7.9% (2nd)	8.2% (2nd)
5	June 7, 2024	8.5% (2nd)	8.5% (1st)
6	June 8, 2024	9.4% (2nd)	10.0% (2nd)
7	June 14, 2024	9.4% (2nd)	9.8% (1st)
8	June 15, 2024	9.1% (2nd)	9.5% (2nd)
9	June 21, 2024	9.1% (2nd)	8.9% (2nd)
10	June 22, 2024	11.1% (2nd)	11.4% (2nd)
11	June 28, 2024	9.7% (2nd)	10.4% (1st)
12	June 29, 2024	10.6% (2nd)	11.2% (2nd)
13	July 5, 2024	11.0% (2nd)	11.7% (1st)
14	July 6, 2024	14.2% (2nd)	14.8% (2nd)
Average		9.2%	9.6%
In the table above, the blue numbers represent the lowest ratings and the red numbers represent the highest ratings.
