= The Cosmonaut's Last Message to the Woman He Once Loved in the Former Soviet Union =

1999 play by David Greig

The Cosmonaut's Last Message to the Woman he once Loved in the Former Soviet Union
- Original language: English
- Written by: David Greig
- Characters: Oleg; Casimir; Keith; Vivienne; Nastasja; Eric; Claire; Bernard; Patient; Sylvia; Proprietors
- Genre: Drama play
- Setting: Space, Scotland, England, France, Norway, 'recently'

Premiere
- Date: April 15, 1999
- Place: Ustinov Studio, Theatre Royal, Bath

The Cosmonaut's Last Message to the Woman he once Loved in the Former Soviet Union is a 1999 drama play in two acts written by Scottish playwright David Greig. It was published in 2002 by Bloomsbury Publishing. The play tells the story of two Soviet cosmonauts stranded aboard their space station without any contact with Earth, a Scottish civil servant who disappears amid a midlife crisis, his wife, a speech therapist, looking for him, a Norwegian peace negotiator, a French UFO researcher and a Russian erotic dancer. Through these stories, the play explores themes of globalization, alienation, identity, loss and love. It was inspired by the real-life story of Soviet cosmonaut Sergei Krikalev who was trapped on board Mir during the dissolution of the Soviet Union.

== Characters ==
- Oleg – Soviet cosmonaut aboard the Harmony 114
- Casimir – Soviet cosmonaut aboard the Harmony 114, Nastasja's father
- Keith – Scottish civil servant, Vivienne's husband
- Vivienne – Scottish speech therapist, Keith's wife
- Nastasja – Russian erotic dancer, Casimir's daughter
- Eric – Norwegian peace negotiator in the Middle East
- Claire – Scottish policewoman
- Bernard – French scientist and UFO researcher
- Patient – man/woman who had a stroke and is treated by Vivienne
- Sylvia – English erotic dancer
- Proprietors – owner of bars at the airports and in Skye

== Plot ==
=== Act One ===
In Act One, Casimir is trying to fix the communication system of the Harmony 114 module, so that they can reestablish communication with Earth and possibly be rescued. His efforts are continually thwarted by Oleg, which leads to a physical altercation between the two. Oleg overpowers Casimir and attempts to make him remember what her daughter looks like, but he is unable to do so. In Edinburgh, Keith and Vivienne are having technical difficulties with their TV. As they try to find out what is causing the problem, Keith says he has to go to London, implying it is a business trip. He does go there, meets up with Casimir's daughter, Nastasja, and has sex with her in a hotel. Nastasja becomes angry as Keith immediately wants to leave and tells him that he is unhappy because he chooses to be. In Edinburgh at the same time, Vivienne gets to know one of her neighbours, Claire, who shows her how to plant flowers. Claire is pregnant and says she is planning to go on a trip to Skye with her husband before she has the baby. Back in London, Keith and Eric are having a discussion about Keith's problems and about Nastasja at a bar in Heathrow airport. Keith shows Eric a tape recording of Natasja breathing then gives him her address. Meanwhile, Oleg and Casimir reconcile, although admit to each other that one of them will most probably die by the other's hand. In the event that Oleg should die and Casimir be rescued, Oleg tells Casimir about a woman he loved, Adrianna, and asks him to give her his message, which he cannot say, but writes down. In a café in Provence, Bernard tells the proprietor that the Americans want to put a Pepsi sign in space to advertise it and that it will have to "compete with the moon". He expresses his hate for Americans, a feeling the proprietor seems to not share at first, but agrees in the end. It turns out Bernard has been trying to contact the Harmony 114 module, although he is convinced it is an alien spaceship. Somewhere else, in a hospital, Vivienne treats a patient with a speech impediment, someone who probably has had a stroke. Back in London, Nastasja and Sylvia are working in a bar as dancers. Keith, after he arrives in Edinburgh at night, goes to a beach and takes off his clothes. Meanwhile, Casimir puts on a suit to go outside and try to fix the communications from there.

=== Act Two ===
In Act Two, Bernard manages to receive a message from the Harmony 114, the word 'harmony'. Claire interrogates Vivienne at the police station after Keith is assumed to have committed suicide by walking into the sea and drowning. Claire says it might just be a "message" and Keith could be alive somewhere, having wanted to leave behind his old life and start a new one. Vivienne remembers he bought himself a tie with a painting of Montagne Sainte-Victoire by Paul Cézanne shortly before his disappearance and decides to go there to search for answers. Oleg records in the ship's log that Casimir died and that he failed to fix the communication system, which is now destroyed beyond repair. Eric meets Nastasja in the bar in London where she works, then takes her shopping. He confronts Sylvia as they seem not to like each other. Nevertheless, as Eric takes Nastasja to Oslo and buys her an apartment in the city centre, Sylvia moves in with her as requested by Nastasja. Meanwhile, in space, Oleg tries to record his message to Adrianna, but stops as he cannot remember her second name. Later he tries again, but says nothing coherent, only that he is sorry. Back in Oslo, Eric asks Sylvia to go to Skye and retrieve the tape from Keith. Vivienne meets Bernard at Montagne Sainte-Victoire. Although they cannot speak each other's language, they understand each other somewhat. Oleg records his last ship's log entry, declaring that his mission is complete, then proceeds to blow up the Harmony 114 somewhere over Europe during. Nastasja and Sylvia cry out as they are witnesses to the explosion on the balcony in Oslo and Bernard has a stroke in the garden watching it. In the very last scene, Keith is told by a proprietor in a bar in Skye that Claire was stabbed to death by a man, when Sylvia enters the establishment and addresses him.

== Writing process ==
Greig stated that he set a rule for himself while writing, according to which he would write what came to his mind without censoring or discarding it. The idea was to "let the mind make its own connections". Greig said one of the first ideas he had was that "everything had to bounce between Earth and space like a satellite signal". Another rule he gave himself was including every location in the play that he had been to the previous year. Regarding the first rule, Greig explained that he felt as if he was merely the "conduit" for the play, and even though later expressed doubts about the way he ended the story, he thought it would have been against his own rule to alter it after having written it.

== Production history ==
The play was first performed in 1999 by Paines Plough at the Ustinov Studio, Theatre Royal in Bath. It was revived three years later at Belvoir St Theatre and was played from February 15 to March 10, 2002. It was also later performed in 2005 at the Donmar Warehouse from April 7 to May 21.

== Casting history ==
Character	Original Cast, 1999	La Jolla Playhouse Cast, 2000	London Cast, 2005
Keith/Bernard	Kenneth Bryans	Mark Nelson	Michael Pennington
Vivienne/Sylvia	Morag Hood	Gretchen Lee Krich	Brid Brennan
Oleg/Patient	Rob Jarvis	Jan Triska, Neil Vipond (Patient)	Paul Higgins, Stuart Mcgugan (Patient)
Nastasja/Claire	Danièle Lydon	Irina Bjorklund	Anna Madeley
Eric/Proprietors	Neil McKinven	John Feltch	Tom Goodman-hill (Eric), Stuart Mcgugan (Proprietors)
Casimir/Patient	Andy Smart	Kurt Fuller	Sean Campion, Stuart Mcgugan (Patient)

== Related works ==
Greig continued Keith and Vivienne's story in his play Pyrenees (2005). Greig also expressed interest in writing more plays with these characters as protagonists, one of them possibly titled Volvo.
