= Colby Award =

William E. Colby Military Writers' Award
- Description: Recognizing a first work making a major contribution to military history, intelligence, or international affairs
- Location: Northfield, Vermont
- Country: United States
- Presented by: Norwich University
- Reward: $5,000
- Website: www.norwich.edu/colby

The William E. Colby Military Writers' Award was established in 1999 by the William E. Colby Military Writers' Symposium at Norwich University in Vermont in order to recognize "a first work of fiction or non-fiction that has made a major contribution to the understanding of intelligence operations, military history, or international affairs." It is named in honor of William Colby. As of 2021, Alex Kershaw is the chair of its selection committee.

The Colby Circle was co-founded by writers Carlo D'Este and W. E. B. Griffin. The award honorarium is currently administered by the Tawani Foundation in Chicago, and presented at the annual William E. Colby Military Writers' Symposium hosted by Norwich University.

== Recipients ==
- 2025 – Simon Shuster, The Showman: Inside the Invasion That Shook the World and Made a Leader of Volodymyr Zelensky
- 2024 – Mariana Budjeryn, Inheriting the Bomb: The Collapse of the USSR and the Nuclear Disarmament of Ukraine
- 2023 – Charles E. Stanley Jr., Lost Airmen: The Epic Rescue of WWII U.S. Bomber Crews Stranded Behind Enemy Lines
- 2022 – Wesley Morgan, The Hardest Place: The American Military Adrift in Afghanistan's Pech Valley
- 2021 – Mark Treanor, A Quiet Cadence: A Novel
- 2020 – Adam Higginbotham, Midnight in Chernobyl: The Untold Story of the World’s Greatest Nuclear Disaster
- 2019 – Paul Scharre, Army of None: Autonomous Weapons and the Future of War
- 2018 – Steven E. Sodergren, The Army of the Potomac in the Overland and Petersburg Campaigns: Union Soldiers and Trench Warfare, 1864–1865
- 2017 – David J. Barron, Waging War: The Clash Between Presidents and Congress, 1776 to ISIS
- 2016 – Nisid Hajari, Midnight's Furies: The Deadly Legacy of India's Partition
- 2015 – Doug Mastriano, Alvin York: A New Biography of the Hero of the Argonne
- 2014 – Logan Beirne, Blood of Tyrants: George Washington and the Forging of the Presidency
- 2013 – Thomas P. McKenna, Kontum: The Battle to Save South Vietnam
- 2012 – Michael Franzak, A Nightmare's Prayer: A Marine Harrier Pilot's War in Afghanistan
- 2011 – Karl Marlantes, Matterhorn: A Novel of the Vietnam War
- 2010 – Jack H. Jacobs, If Not Now, When? Duty and Sacrifice in America's Time of Need
- 2009 – Dexter Filkins, The Forever War; and Marcus Luttrell, Lone Survivor: The Eyewitness Account of Operation Redwing and the Lost Heroes of SEAL Team 10
- 2008 – R. Alan King, Twice Armed: An American Soldier's Battle for the Hearts and Minds in Iraq
- 2007 – John Glusman, Conduct Under Fire: Four American Doctors and Their Fight for Life as Prisoners of the Japanese, 1941–1945; and Ian W. Toll, Six Frigates: The Epic History of the Founding of the U.S. Navy
- 2006 – Nathaniel Fick, One Bullet Away: The Making of a Marine Officer; and Kevin Weddle, Lincoln's Tragic Admiral: The Life of Samuel Francis Du Pont
- 2005 – Sidney Shachnow and Jann Robbins, Hope and Honor: A Memoir of a Soldier's Courage and Survival; and Jon Meacham, Franklin and Winston: An Intimate Portrait of an Epic Friendship
- 2004 – Bing West and Ray L. Smith, The March Up: Taking Baghdad with the 1st Marine Division; and Robert L. Bateman, No Gun Ri: A Military History of the Korean War Incident
- 2003 – Bryan Mark Rigg, Hitler's Jewish Soldiers: The Untold Story of Nazi Racial Laws and Men of Jewish Descent in the German Military
- 2002 – Patrick K. O'Donnell, Beyond Valor: World War II's Ranger and Airborne Veterans Reveal the Heart of Combat; and Ralph Wetterhahn, The Last Battle: The Mayaguez Incident and the End of the Vietnam War
- 2001 – James Bradley with Ron Powers, Flags of Our Fathers: Heroes of Iwo Jima
- 2000 – B. G. Burkett and Glenna Whitley, Stolen Valor: How the Vietnam Generation Was Robbed of Its Heroes and Its History
- 1999 – Fred Chiaventone, A Road We Do Not Know: A Novel of Custer at Little Bighorn; and Bill Harlow, Circle William: A Novel
