= No Gun Ri: A Military History of the Korean War Incident =

2002 Koren War book by Robert Bateman

- Author: Robert Bateman
- Language: English
- Genre: Non-fiction
- Publication date: 2002
- Publication place: United States

No Gun Ri: A Military History of the Korean War Incident is a 2002 book by United States military officer Robert Bateman about the events that took place at No Gun Ri in 1950 and the controversy that followed. Bateman contested the veracity of a Pulitzer Prize-winning account published earlier. The book was awarded the 2004 Colby Award for military history.

== Background ==
The author's first major run-in with major media was during his archival research into the events which took place at No Gun Ri. During the research he established that the Associated Press team which had first publicized the story of No Gun Ri had relied upon false testimony from Edward Daily, who had not been at the battle and had a record of deception, and probably two others who were not there as well. Conservative media were especially critical of the Pulitzer-winning account based on Bateman's findings. Bateman contended that the AP's evidence was insufficient to support their account, particularly the lack of bodies found in the aftermath.

Bateman presented his archival research materials to reporter Joe Galloway, then at U.S. News & World Report. Galloway's subsequent articles on the issues and evidence led to a media-fight between the two institutions. The Associated Press then tried to have Bateman's book stopped, but their efforts were publicized and the efforts aborted.

Ultimately, Daily admitted that he had not been at No Gun Ri. He was later convicted of fraud in federal court for falsely claiming veteran's benefits and medical care for more than a decade. Bateman details these events in his book on the same topic. Bateman subsequently engaged AP journalist Charles Hanley in print and in public appearances at historical venues.

== About the author ==
Bateman taught military history at the United States Military Academy and on an adjunct basis at George Mason University. Bateman is a United States Army Ranger, he was a Staff Company commander in the 7th United States Cavalry, and served in Iraq from 2005 through 2006. He was once a "military fellow" at the Center for Strategic and International Studies. He is currently assigned to the Pentagon, and teaches in the Security Studies program at Georgetown University. Bateman also writes a bi-weekly column as a media critic/ethicist for the Committee of Concerned Journalists where he is known to be extremely critical of the New York Times. That site is sponsored by the Knight Foundation and the journalism program of the University of Missouri. He is also a regular columnist for the military-intellectual site Small Wars Journal.

Bateman worked with B.G. Burkett on investigating accounts of the Korean events. Burkett is the author of Stolen Valor, about phony Vietnam War veterans and deceptive histories used for personal gain.

Bateman also wrote the book Digital War, A View from the Front Lines (1999). From Iraq he wrote weekly columns for the MSNBC.COM weblog "Altercation," hosted by liberal commentator Eric Alterman, and the Washington Examiner. He has published editorials in the New York Post and has appeared on several National Public Radio programs, as well as on Public Broadcasting Service programs hosted by conservatives Ben Wattenberg and Tucker Carlson.

In fall 2007, Bateman had a dispute with military historian Victor Davis Hanson over Hanson's book Carnage and Culture. Bateman claimed the book was factually challenged, historically unsupported and unsupportable during a four-part series on the blog of Eric Alterman. Bateman started with a general attack on Hanson's lack of scholarship as a modern military historian, as Hanson was educated as a "classicist".

=== Viral essay ===
Bateman's former roommate, journalist Joseph L. Galloway used an essay Bateman wrote about wounded soldiers visiting the Pentagon as his 2007 Memorial Day column.
