= Waging War =

Waging War may refer to:

- Waging War (album), a 2002 album by the band Swift
- "Waging War" (song), a 2008 song by CeCe Winans
- "Waging War", a song by Hellyeah from their eponymous album
- Waging War: The Clash Between Presidents and Congress, 1776 to ISIS, a 2016 book by David Jeremiah Barron
