= Jerome A. Barron =

American legal scholar

Jerome A. Barron is the Harold H. Greene Professor of Law Emeritus at the George Washington University Law School and a former dean of the law school. He is primarily known for his influence about the doctrine of free speech in the United States.

== Education and legal career ==
Barron received his Bachelor of Arts from Tufts University, his Juris Doctor from Yale Law School, and received his Master of Laws from George Washington Law School in 1960. After graduation, he moved to Boston to begin his legal practice.

Barron clerked for a year for Marvin Jones, the chief judge of the U.S. Court of Claims.

Barron argued the cause for appellees in Miami Herald Publishing Co. v. Tornillo, 418 U.S. 241 (1974), after arguing the case before the Florida and United States Supreme Courts.

== Academic career ==
Barron joined the faculty in 1965. In 1967, the Harvard Law Review published Barron's article "Access to the Press—A New First Amendment Right." In the article, Barron argued that the press did not cover the free marketplace of ideas; instead concentrated corporate ownership effectively censored free speech and quelled unorthodox ideas. He suggested that the government should be more active in forcing publishers to diversify the range of opinions in their material.

On October 12, 2007, a symposium was held to commemorate the 40th anniversary of Barron’s seminal article in the Harvard Law Review calling for an affirmative First Amendment right to access the press. U.S. Supreme Court Justice Stephen G. Breyer was one of the speakers at the event.

He served as dean of the Law School from 1979 to 1988.

Barron holds one of the prestigious endowed professorships at The George Washington University - Harold H. Greene Professor of Law, established in 2000. Barron also held the endowed professorship of Lyle T. Alverson Professor of Law.

== Notable accomplishments ==
- Argued and participated in First Amendment cases in the U.S. Supreme Court
- Served as a consultant to the Senate-convened Select Committee on Presidential Campaign Activities (Watergate)
- Chair of the ABA Committee on Graduate Legal Education
- Chair, Mass Communication Law, AALS
- Chair, Graduate Legal Education Committee, ABA
- In 2004, he was the Fulbright Distinguished Chair in Law at the University of Trento in Italy.
- Author of dozens of Law Review articles, chapters in books, and book reviews.

== Personal life ==
With his wife Myra, Barron is the father of three children, Jennifer Barron, Jonathan Barron, and David Barron. David Barron serves as a judge on the United States Court of Appeals for the First Circuit. Jonathan Barron is an English professor at the University of Maine. Jennifer Barron is a Circuit Court Judge in DuPage County, IL.

== Publications ==
- Freedom of the Press for Whom? (1973)
- Constitutional Law: Principles and Policy (6th ed. 2002) (with Dienes, McCormack, and Redish)
- Constitutional Law: Principles and Policy (7th ed. 2006) (with Dienes, McCormack, and Redish)
- Mass Communication Law (6th ed. 1998) (with Gillmor and Simon)
- Constitutional Law in a Nutshell (5th ed. 2003) (with Dienes)
- Constitutional Law, Black Letter Series (7th ed. 2005)
