= David J. Barron =

American judge (born 1967)

David Barron
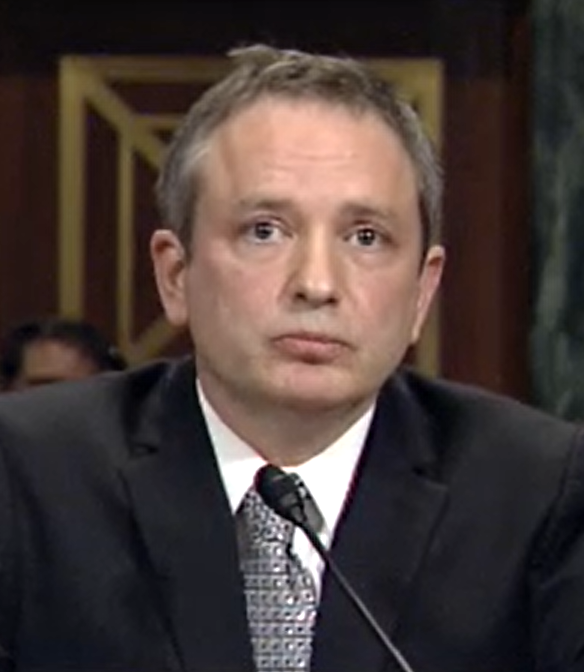

Chief Judge of the United States Court of Appeals for the First Circuit
- Incumbent
- Assumed office April 1, 2022
- Preceded by: Jeffrey R. Howard

Judge of the United States Court of Appeals for the First Circuit
- Incumbent
- Assumed office May 23, 2014
- Appointed by: Barack Obama
- Preceded by: Michael Boudin

United States Assistant Attorney General for the Office of Legal Counsel
- Acting
- In office 2009–2010
- Preceded by: Steven G. Bradbury (acting)
- Succeeded by: Jonathan Cedarbaum (acting)

Personal details
- Born: David Jeremiah Barron; 1967 (age 58–59) Washington, D.C., U.S.
- Spouse: Juliette Kayyem
- Children: 3
- Education: Harvard University (BA, JD)

David Jeremiah Barron (born 1967) is an American lawyer who serves as the Chief United States circuit judge of the United States Court of Appeals for the First Circuit and former S. William Green Professor of Public Law at Harvard Law School. He previously served as the Acting Assistant Attorney General of the Office of Legal Counsel at the United States Department of Justice.

== Early life and education ==
Barron was born 1967 in Washington, D.C., and is the son of George Washington University Law School professor and former dean Jerome A. Barron. He received a Bachelor of Arts degree, magna cum laude, in 1989, from Harvard College, serving as president of The Harvard Crimson. After graduation, he worked as a reporter for The News & Observer in Raleigh, North Carolina, from 1989 to 1991.

Returning to school, Barron received a Juris Doctor, magna cum laude, in 1994, from Harvard Law School, where he was a member of the Harvard Law Review. He was a law clerk for Judge Stephen Reinhardt of the United States Court of Appeals for the Ninth Circuit from 1994 to 1995 and for Justice John Paul Stevens of the United States Supreme Court from 1995 to 1996. He worked as an attorney-advisor in the Justice Department's Office of Legal Counsel from 1996 to 1999.

== Academic career ==
Barron joined the Harvard Law School faculty as an assistant professor in 1999 and became a professor in 2004. He left the faculty upon his confirmation to the Court of Appeals in 2014.

In 2009, while on leave from his faculty position, Barron rejoined the Office of Legal Counsel as Acting assistant attorney general. In 2010, he authored a secret memo which provided the legal foundation for President Obama's unprecedented decision to order a drone strike on Anwar al-Awlaki, an American citizen who was a radical Islamic militant living in Yemen. Barron's memo was described by The New York Times Editorial Board as "a slapdash pastiche of legal theories—some based on obscure interpretations of British and Israeli law—that was clearly tailored to the desired result." A lawyer for the ACLU described the memo as "disturbing" and "ultimately an argument that the president can order targeted killings of Americans without ever having to account to anyone outside the executive branch."

For Barron's service, he received the National Intelligence Exceptional Achievement Medal from the Office of the Director of National Intelligence, as well as the Secretary of Defense Medal for Outstanding Public Service.

Barron returned to the Harvard Law School faculty in 2010 and was named the S. William Green Professor of Public Law in 2011. In 2012, he was appointed by Massachusetts Governor Deval Patrick to the Massachusetts Board of Higher Education. and the Massachusetts State College Building Authority. He left academia in 2014 after his confirmation as a federal judge.

He was elected fellow of the American Academy of Arts and Sciences in 2020.

== Federal judicial service ==
On September 24, 2013, President Barack Obama nominated Barron to serve as a United States Circuit Judge of the United States Court of Appeals for the First Circuit, to the seat vacated by Judge Michael Boudin, who assumed senior status on June 1, 2013. On January 16, 2014, his nomination was reported out of committee by a 10–8 vote. On Thursday, May 15, 2014, Senate Majority Leader Harry Reid filed a motion to invoke cloture on the nomination. On Wednesday, May 21, 2014, the United States Senate invoked cloture on his nomination by a 52–43 vote. Several senators, including Mark Udall (D) and Rand Paul (R), pledged to oppose Barron's nomination unless the administration published the secret memos Barron authored on the legality of killing American citizens with drone strikes. Until senators began raising concerns about Barron's nomination, only those on the Judiciary and Intelligence committees had seen any of the classified memos. On May 22, 2014, his nomination was confirmed by a 53–45 vote. He received his judicial commission on May 23, 2014. He became Chief Judge on April 1, 2022, when Judge Jeffrey R. Howard assumed senior status.

== Publications ==
Barron is known for coauthoring with Martin S. Lederman a Harvard Law Review article titled "The Commander in Chief at the Lowest Ebb - Framing the Problem, Doctrine and Original Understanding", which was an attack on the advice given by the Office of Legal Counsel to President George W. Bush justifying Bush's use of executive power during the war on terror.

In 2016, Simon & Schuster published his book Waging War: The Clash Between Presidents and Congress, 1776 to ISIS. In February 2017, Barron was named the winner of Norwich University's 2017 Colby Award, which is awarded for works that make major academic contributions to the understanding of military history, intelligence activities, and foreign relations.

== See also ==
- Barack Obama Supreme Court candidates
- List of Jewish American jurists
- List of law clerks for the fourth seat of the Supreme Court of the United States

Legal offices
| Preceded by Michael Boudin | Judge of the United States Court of Appeals for the First Circuit; 2014–present | Incumbent |
| Preceded by Jeffrey R. Howard | Chief Judge of the United States Court of Appeals for the First Circuit; 2022–present | Incumbent |
