= Midnight's Furies: The Deadly Legacy of India's Partition =

Midnight's Furies: The Deadly Legacy of India’s Partition
- Author: Nisid Hajari
- Subject: Partition of India in 1947
- Genre: History
- Publisher: Houghton Mifflin Harcourt
- Publication date: 2015
- Pages: xxii, 328 pages, 8 unnumbered pages of plates
- Awards: Colby Award
- ISBN: 9780547669212
- OCLC: 885225559

Midnight's Furies: The Deadly Legacy of India's Partition is a non-fiction book by Nisid Hajari, published in 2015 by Houghton Mifflin Harcourt. The book chronicles the partition of India and the riots and other violence that followed. It was the 2016 recipient of the Colby Award.
