= Michael Franzak =

American writer

Michael V. Franzak
- Military career
- Allegiance: United States
- Branch: Navy, Marine Corps
- Service years: Navy: 1981-1983; Marine Corps: 1987-2006
- Rank: Lieutenant Colonel
- Awards: Distinguished Flying Cross with Combat V, Air Medal with strike #5

Michael "Zak" Franzak is an American writer. He is the author of A Nightmare's Prayer, his memoir. Currently, Franzak lives in Raleigh, North Carolina with his wife, son, and daughter.

== Military ==
When Franzak graduated from high school, it was not his original plan to join the Navy. According to Franzak, he was "desperate and had nowhere to go." He joined the Navy in 1981. Franzak attended boot camp, and then served as an aviation ordinanceman with VF-1 aboard the USS Ranger and USS Kitty Hawk.

In 1983, he was presented the NROTC scholarship, while on active duty. Franzak attended Texas A&M University. While attending school, he decided to change his line of service from Navy to Marine Corps. In 1987, Franzak graduated from college with military and academic awards. He was also commissioned 2nd Lieutenant.

In May 1988, Franzak graduated from The Basic School, where he earned honors and finished at the top of his class.

In 1990, he was "winged," and till 2006, Franzak flew AV-8B Harriers. This particular jet has an accident rate three times higher than the other Marine Corps' airplane, F-18 Hornet, and is known by the name, the "Widow Maker."

In 2002 and 2003, Franzak was deployed to Afghanistan as a Marine jet fighter pilot. He was a part of "The Flying Nightmares" squadron. Franzak served as an executive officer of VMA-513 Because the air was too thin due to the mountains in Afghanistan, Franzak and his crew had to fly by night and sleep during the day.

In 2005, Franzak received the Distinguished Flying Cross with Combat "V" for his combat action on August 25, 2003. Franzak earned this particular award for his "heroism while participating in aerial flight, while serving as pilot of an AV-8B Harrier" in Bagram, Afghanistan. He rescued a pinned-down Army reserve unit in Afghanistan. Along with the Distinguished Flying Cross, he is also the recipient of the Air Medal with strike award number "5" and many other awards.

Franzak retired in 2006. He now works as a contract pilot, where one of his duties is to "fly ice cream and parts and people around."

== Author ==
Franzak's memoir was published in 2010. It was the "first Afghanistan memoir to be published by a Marine Harrier pilot." The basis of the book comes from the three journals he kept while in Afghanistan. Franzak has said the book addresses "combat, love, sacrifice, and fear."

Franzak donated a portion of his royalties to TAPS, a nonprofit organization assisting families and friends of fallen soldiers.

In 2012, Franzak's memoir, A Nightmare's Prayer won the William E. Colby Award.
