= Logan Beirne =

American writer, historian and lawyer

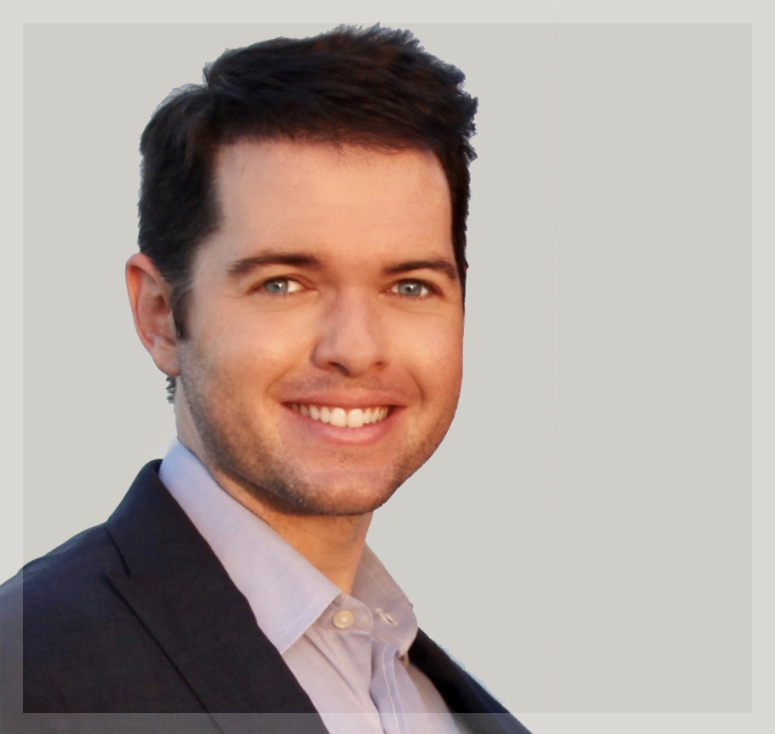
- Education: Fairfield University (BS); Queen's University at Kingston; Yale University (JD)
- Occupations: CEO, Writer, Historian
- Writing career
- Subject: George Washington
- Notable works: Blood of Tyrants: George Washington, the Forging of the Presidency
- Notable awards: 2014 William E. Colby Award, Edgar M. Cullen Prize

Logan Beirne is an American businessman, writer, and attorney. He is Chief Legal Officer of Strive Asset Management and teaches at Yale Law School. His book, Blood of Tyrants: George Washington and the Forging of the Presidency, won the Colby Award for best military history.

Beirne founded a legal technology company called Matterhorn Transactions, Inc. with Mark Gerson in 2011 and sold it to DealPulse, Inc in 2023. He has invested in and co-founded additional successful companies, including Artusi Music, Inc.

== Early life and education ==
Beirne married Yale College dean Hannah Peck in 2019 in Dublin, Ireland. He was born in Bronxville, New York and grew up in Milford, Connecticut. His parents, Sheila (former fashion buyer) and Thomas (former businessman and politician), were interested in American history, and would often take young Beirne to history and war reenactments. Beirne is a descendant of US President James Madison, the “Father of the Constitution”.

Beirne was a Fulbright Scholar at Queen's University, where he studied economics. He earned his J.D. degree from Yale Law School, where he received the Edgar M. Cullen Prize for his constitutional scholarship and was awarded an Olin Fellowship to write on presidential power. He studied international business transactions under the direction of Amy Chua and Bill Eskridge. In 2009, Beirne was admitted as an attorney to both the New York and Connecticut bars.

== Career ==
Beirne is Chief Legal Officer of Strive Asset Management. He formerly was Chief Executive Officer of Matterhorn Transactions, which provided data analytics to thousands of law firms across the US, Canada, and UK. Beirne successfully sold the company to DealPulse, Inc., an artificial intelligence company, in 2023.

Beirne is a faculty fellow at Yale Law School. He teaches Ethics in Markets, Financial Markets and Corporate Law at Yale. He teaches a legal clinic with Jonathan R. Macey and Greg Fleming (businessman). Beirne has invested in and co-founded a museum systems company called Collection Harbor and a music software business called Artusi.

After his Fulbright Fellowship at Queen's University, Beirne worked for the private equity arm of GE Capital before entering Yale Law School. While Beirne was still attending law school, he was a summer associate at the law firm Sullivan and Cromwell, and subsequently worked as an attorney there after graduation. He was also an investment banker at J.P. Morgan & Co.

Beirne is a professional public speaker who has given speeches across the U.S. and appeared on numerous news programs.

His debut book, Blood of Tyrants: George Washington, the Forging of the Presidency, began as his thesis at Yale Law School. He is represented by literary agents Writers Reps. While doing research for the book, he discovered letters written by Washington in his ancestors' house.

== Publications ==
- Blood of Tyrants: George Washington & the Forging of the Presidency. Encounter Books. ISBN 978-1594036408
- Snowden’s Benedict Arnold Path at USA Today
- American Amazons at New York Post
- Military Commissions are American Justice at USA Today
- What would George Washington say about the US now? at Fox News
- The Brit who stole Independence Day at National Review
- When to Pull the Trigger – And When Not To at The Washington Times
- The George Washington you never knew at Fox News
- Tsarnaev: What would Washington have done? at Reuters
