= Nisid Hajari =

Indian-American writer

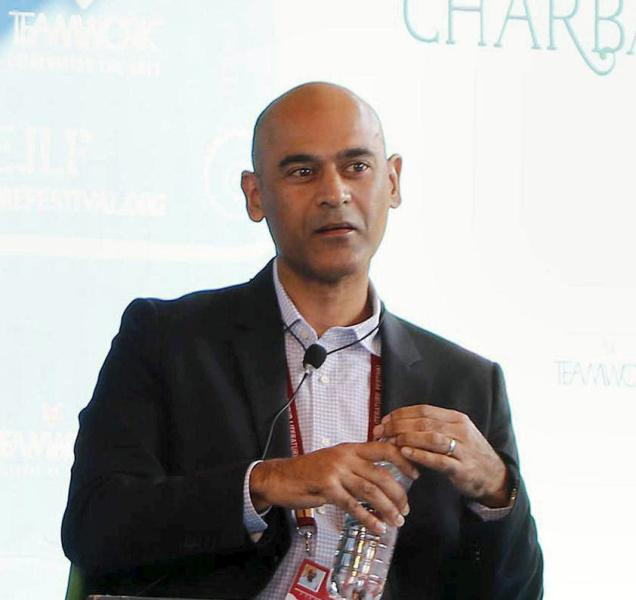
- Hajari at the 2016 Jaipur Literature Festival
- Born: Bombay, India
- Education: Princeton University (BA); Columbia University (MA)
- Occupations: Author, writer
- Writing career
- Language: English
- Notable awards: 2016 Colby Award

Nisid Hajari is an Indian-American writer, editor, and foreign affairs analyst. He is the author of Midnight's Furies: The Deadly Legacy of India's Partition, winner of the 2016 Colby Award.

== Personal life ==
Hajari was born in Bombay and raised in Seattle, Washington. He has lived in New York, Hong Kong, New Delhi, London and Singapore.

== Education ==
Hajari graduated from Princeton University in 1990 with a B.A. in English. He earned a master's degree in comparative literature at Columbia University in 1996. He is a member of the Council on Foreign Relations.

== Career ==
Hajari is Asia editor for Bloomberg View, the editorial board of Bloomberg News. He writes about Asian politics, history, and economics.

Before that, Hajari spent a decade as an editor at Newsweek. He served as deputy to Fareed Zakaria from 2002 to 2006 and then as Foreign Editor and Managing Editor of the U.S. edition of the magazine from 2006 to 2011.

From 1997 to 2001, he worked as a writer and editor for Time magazine in Hong Kong. Before moving to Asia, he spent time as a rock critic for Entertainment Weekly and a book critic for The Village Voice. He has written for The New York Times, the Financial Times, Esquire, Slate, The Washington Post, Foreign Policy, and Condé Nast Traveler, among other publications.

He has appeared as a foreign affairs commentator on CNN, BBC, NBC, MSNBC, CBC, and NPR, as well as The Charlie Rose Show.

== Writing ==
Hajari's Midnight's Furies is a narrative history of the 1947 partition of India and Pakistan, during which approximately one million people died. It was named one of the best books of 2015 by NPR, The Seattle Times, Quartz, Amazon, and The Daily Beast. The Wall Street Journal called it "an engaging and incisive contribution to the vast literature on Partition," while author William Dalrymple, writing in The Guardian, praised Hajari for making "the complex and tragic story of the great divide into a page-turner."

The book won the Colby Award for first book on military, intelligence or international affairs. It was named a finalist for the Arthur Ross Book Award, the Shakti Bhatt Prize, and the Tata Literature Live! First Book Award. It reached No. 1 on the Indian nonfiction bestseller list.

Hajari also co-edited the 2013 essay collection Reimagining India: Unlocking the Potential of Asia's Next Superpower.
