= Steven E. Sodergren =

American historian

- Occupation: Historian
- Notable work: The Army of the Potomac in the Overland & Petersburg Campaigns
- Awards: 2018 Colby Award

Steven E. Sodergren is a historian and University Professor employed by Norwich University. His book The Army of the Potomac in the Overland & Petersburg Campaigns was the recipient of the 2018 Colby Award.
