= Chung Eun-yong =

South Korean policeman and activist

- Born: 1923; South Korea
- Died: August 1, 2014 (aged 90–91); Daejeon
- Occupations: policeman, activist
- Years active: 1955–present

Korean name
- Hangul: 정은용
- Hanja: 鄭殷溶
- RR: Jeong Eunyong
- MR: Chŏng Ŭnyong

Chung Eun-yong (1923 – August 1, 2014) was a South Korean policeman and activist. Chung initiated a decades long investigation into the July 1950 No Gun Ri Massacre by elements of the 7th Cavalry Regiment during the early days of the Korean War. Survivors estimated 100 people were killed in the No Gun Ri air attack and another 300 refugees died in attacks under a nearby railroad bridge. Chung Eun-yong's four-year-old son and two-year-old daughter were among the victims killed, while his wife, Park Sun-yong, suffered serious injuries.

Chung Eun-yong, who returned to his pre-war job as a police officer in Daejeon in the mid-1950s, learned that the United States was accepting claims for damages related to the Korean War in 1960. He joined with several survivors of the No Gun Ri Massacre, but the group missed the application deadline. Chung quietly continued to gather evidence at archives in Seoul and Daejeon for the next three decades during South Korea's authoritarian military rule. Professionally, he worked for a government agency which combated potential Communist threats to South Korea. He also partnered to operate a small bottle manufacturing plant in Daejeon. He retired in the 1980s. Still the loss of his children never left him. He was later quoted by the Associated Press, "No Gun Ri never escaped my mind one single day."

In early 1990s, South Korea's military dictatorship was replaced by a democratic government. By this time, Chung Eun-yong had concluded, through his research, that the 1st Cavalry Division, the parent unit of the 7th Cavalry Regiment, bore the responsibility for the No Gun Ri Massacre. Chung concluded that South Korea's transition to democracy had finally given him the opportunity to speak out on the No Gun Ri Massacre for the first time since the 1960s. He wrote a novel, "Do You Know Our Agony?", based on the events of the No Gun Ri, but it was rejected by ten different publishers due to the controversial nature of his charges. The book was finally published in 1994.

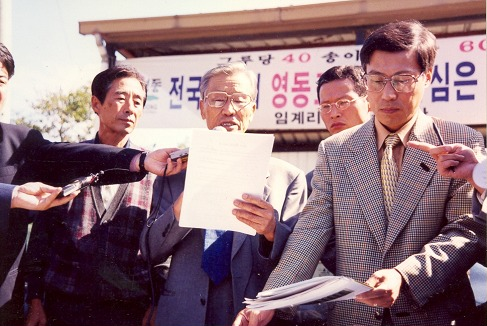
In October 1999, after release of the Associated Press report confirming the No Gun Ri refugee killings, Chung Eun-yong, leader of the survivors committee, reads a petition in Seoul, South Korea, calling for a "truthful and speedy" investigation.

Chung Eun-yong also began a series of petitions to the American government in the early 1990s. He demanded a full investigation, an apology and compensation for survivors and victim's families. His petitions were ignored or dismissed until a 1999 investigation by Associated Press uncovered evidence which corroborated the accusations of Chung and other survivors. The Associated Press interviewed U.S. veterans who were near the site of the massacre and found declassified U.S. files stating that commanders had ordered their forces to shoot civilians in the war zone. While other news organizations, U.S. News & World Report, founded flaws with the AP's investigation, including a false eyewitness account by veteran Edward L. Daily, who was later proven not to have been at No Gun Ri, the AP investigation strengthened Chung's claims.

Chung's petitions and the AP's stories caused American and South Korean authorities to launch an investigation. The United States Army first acknowledged the killings at No Gun Ri in January 2001, but did not assign blame for the massacre. U.S. President Bill Clinton issued a statement of regret concerning No Gun Ri, but did not offer a formal apology. No compensation was offered to victims or survivors at the time. Chung and his allies called the investigation a "whitewash." They also rejected U.S. offers to set up a scholarship fund and build a monument at No Gun Ri, which would have been dedicated to all of the Korean War's civilian victims rather than a specific memorial to those killed at No Gun Ri.

The South Korean National Assembly created a committee to identify No Gun Ri victims in 2004. In 2005, the committee found 163 dead or missing victims and fifty-five wounded, while noting that reports were not submitted on many additional victims. Lawmakers also gave medical subsidies for survivors and established No Gun Ri Peace Park, a 29-acre park at the site, in 2004.

In 1999, Chung joined with American veterans of No Gun Ri at a reconciliation service held at a church in Cleveland, Ohio.

Chung Eun-yong was born in Chu Gok Ri, Korea, in 1923. He wanted to be an architect, but only had the money to attend railroad school. He became a telegraph operator for the Japanese during the Japanese occupation of Korea, but left the job following a fistfight with a Japanese co-worker. He joined the Korean National Police in 1944 to avoid being drafted into the Japanese Army during World War II. Shortly after joining the police, Chung married his wife, Park Sun-yong, in an arranged marriage, which had been set up by a fortune teller. He quit the police in 1949, citing corruption, and enrolled at law school in Seoul. The outbreak of the Korean War cut short his studies.

Chung Eun-yong, who had been in declining health, died on August 1, 2014, at his home in Daejeon, South Korea, at the age of 91. He was survived by his wife of 69 years, Park Sun-yong, and a son born after the Korean War, Chung Koo-do. Chung Koo-do is the chairman of the No Gun Ri International Peace Foundation, which operates the No Gun Ri Peace Park.
