= Alvin York: A New Biography of the Hero of the Argonne =

- Author: Douglas V. Mastriano
- Subject: Alvin York
- Genre: Biography, History
- Publisher: University Press of Kentucky
- Publication date: 2014
- Pages: xii, 323 pages
- Awards: Colby Award
- ISBN: 9780813145198
- OCLC: 858901754

Alvin York: A New Biography of the Hero of the Argonne is a biography of Alvin York by Douglas V. Mastriano published in 2014 by the University Press of Kentucky.

== Awards ==
The book received the Colby Award in 2015.

== Revised edition ==
A rival graduate student publicly raised questions about a number of citations in the book at the same time Mastriano was preparing for the Pennsylvania gubernatorial campaign. After further review, the book is being updated and re-released. The publisher also reviewed Mastranio’s second book “Thunder in the Argonne” and does not plan any updates.
