= John Glusman =

American book editor

- Education: Columbia University (BA, MA)
- Occupation: Editor
- Writing career
- Notable works: Conduct Under Fire: Four American Doctors and Their Fight for Life as Prisoners of the Japanese, 1941-1945

John A. Glusman is vice president and executive editor at W. W. Norton and Company, the largest independent, employee-owned publisher in the United States, and the author of Conduct Under Fire: Four American Doctors and Their Fight for Life as Prisoners of the Japanese, 1941-1945.

== Education ==
Glusman received his B.A. in English and Comparative Literature from Columbia College in 1978, and his M.A. in English and Comparative Literature from the Graduate School of Arts and Sciences at Columbia University in 1980.

== Career ==
John A. Glusman began his publishing career at Random House in 1980, where he became managing editor of The Modern Library and an associate editor of Vintage Books and the Random House imprint. From 1984 to 1986 he served as editor-in-chief of Washington Square Press, where he published Saul Bellow, Joan Didion, Graham Greene, J. G. Ballard, and Graham Swift in paperback. In 1986 he moved to Macmillan, where he launched the Collier Fiction series, the Best American Poetry annual, and published the early work of Jim Crace, John Banville, William T. Vollmann, Emmanuel Carrère, and Annie Proulx, who credited Glusman with encouraging her to write novels.

From 1990 to 2004, Glusman worked at Farrar, Straus, & Giroux, rising to the position of editor-in-chief and executive vice president. There his authors included Nobel Prize winners Aleksandr Solzhenitsyn and Czeslaw Milosz, Pulitzer Prize winners Laurie Garrett and David Rohde, National Book Award winner Richard Powers, National Book Critics Circle Award winner Jim Crace, New York Times bestselling authors Rosellen Brown and Gina Kolata, in addition to Orhan Pamuk, Paul Bowles, Peter Handke, Josef Skvorecky, Rose Tremain, and Peter Cameron. In 2004 he was named vice president and executive editor of Harmony Books at the Crown Publishing Group, where his authors included New York Times bestselling authors Erik Larson, David Sanger, Ben Macintyre, and Alice Hoffman.

From 2011 until 2023 Glusman was vice president and editor-in-chief of Norton. His authors include New York Times bestselling authors Neil deGrasse Tyson, Frans de Waal, Ronan Farrow, and Scott Weidensaul, Pulitzer Prize winners Richard Powers, David Rohde, and William Taubman, National Book Critics Circle Award winner and MacArthur "Genius" Fellow Saidiya Hartman, National Book Critics Circle Award winner John Lahr, Pulitzer Prize finalist James M. Scott, Sami Rohr Prize for Jewish Literature winner Benjamin Balint, Los Angeles Times Book Prize winner William Souder, Thomas Chatterton Williams, Glenn Loury, and Los Angeles Times Book Prize winner Margaret Burnham.

Glusman has taught at the Graduate Writing Program at Columbia University, the New School for Social Research, the Columbia Publishing Course and the Squaw Valley Writer's Conference. He has written for The New Leader, Dissent, Virginia Quarterly Review, Sewanee Review, The Economist, Gourmet and Travel + Leisure. As a member of Helsinki Watch in the 1980s he wrote on human rights issues for Rolling Stone, The Village Voice, Spin, The Paris Review, and in association with Human Rights in China he published Children of the Dragon, the first U.S. documentary history of the Tiananmen Square massacre.

His book Conduct Under Fire: Four American Doctors and their Fight for Life as Prisoners of the Japanese, 1941-1945, based on his father's experiences as a prisoner-of-war in the Philippines and Japan, was published by Viking Press in 2004 and Penguin Press in 2005. The historian John Dower praised it as "an intimate and meticulous account of cruelty, courage, and extraordinary human resilience."

In June 2019, he was honored as a Distinguished Alumnus of Columbia University's Graduate School of Arts and Sciences for his contribution to publishing.

== Advocate for E-books ==
In an interview for The Book Deal, Glusman stated that "Ebook readers buy more books than those who buy traditional books." He believes that ebooks will help publishers in the long term and that it is the role of publishers to provide books across all formats.

== Awards ==
In 2009, Glusman received a Guggenheim Fellowship for his non-fiction writing. Conduct Under Fire won the Colby Award in 2007 for the best book of military non-fiction by a first-time author.

== Personal life ==
He lives in Bedford, New York with his wife, Emily Bestler, editorial director of Emily Bestler Books at Atria/Simon & Schuster, with whom he has three adult children.
