= The Forever War (Filkins book) =

Non-fiction book by Dexter Filkins

- Author: Dexter Filkins
- Language: English
- Subject: Iraq War
- Genre: Non-fiction
- Publisher: Alfred A. Knopf
- Publication date: 2008
- ISBN: 978-0-307-26639-2 (Hardcover)
- OCLC: 213407458

The Forever War is a non-fiction book by American journalist Dexter Filkins about his observations on assignment in Afghanistan and Iraq during the 2001 War in Afghanistan and the Iraq War.

As a foreign correspondent for The New York Times, Dexter Filkins has covered the wars in Afghanistan and Iraq since 2001. He has been a finalist for a Pulitzer Prize and a winner of a George Polk Award and two Overseas Press Club Awards.

== Awards ==
The book made the New York Times Book Review list of "10 Best Books of 2008" as chosen by the paper's editors, and was awarded the 2008 National Book Critics Circle Award in General Nonfiction. It was named one of the best nonfiction books of the year by among others The New York Times, Amazon.com, The Washington Post, Time magazine and the Boston Globe.

The book received the 2009 Colby Award.

== See also ==
- No Ordinary Assignment: A Memoir by Jane Ferguson (war correspondent).
