= Fred Chiaventone =

American novelist

- Born: March 25, 1951 (age 75)
- Occupations: Novelist; screenwriter; military historian

Frederick J. Chiaventone, (born March 25, 1951) also known as Fred Chiaventone, is a novelist, screenwriter, military historian, consultant, commentator, and retired cavalry officer. His novel A Road We Do Not Know: A Novel of Custer at the Little Bighorn won the 1999 Ambassador William E. Colby Award.

== Military ==
Chiaventone served in the U.S. Army from 1973 to 1993. His rank was Lieutenant Colonel. Chiaventone served as Chief of Special Operations for 6th US Army and, along with President George H.W. Bush, was interviewed about counterinsurgency operations by correspondent Gisela Duarte for the Salvadoran television program Frente-a-Frente. He is the inventor of the U.S. Army's Reserve Components Tank Commanders' Course. He has been a featured speaker at the National Press Club and colleges and universities throughout the United States. He is Professor Emeritus of International Security Affairs, counter-insurgency, counter-terrorism and National Security at the United States Army Command and General Staff College.

== Writing ==
Chiaventone has written a number of screenplays and books to include, A Road We Do Not Know: A Novel of Custer at the Little Bighorn (1996) and Moon of Bitter Cold (2002). Both books received rave reviews. One reviewer said of, A Road We Do Not Know..., "An immensely effective and affecting first novel...it offers a powerful, unsparing portrait of close combat on the frontier." About Moon of Bitter Cold, a reviewer called it, "meticulously accurate," "gritty," and "evenhanded."

A Road We Do Not Know: A Novel of Custer at the Little Bighorn won the 1999 Ambassador William E. Colby Award. It was nominated for the Pulitzer Prize, and voted the Best Novel of the Little Bighorn by the Little Big Horn Associates. He won a Western Heritage Wrangler award for his novel Moon of Bitter Cold. and was inducted into the Western Heritage Hall of Fame.

In 1997, Chiaventone was inducted into the elite "Colby Circle." Other writers associated with this group include: Tom Clancy, W.E.B. Griffin, James Webb, and Mark Bowden. This group of writers is recognized for their contributions "to public understanding of military and political affairs."

Chiaventone's articles have appeared in the Chicago Tribune, The New York Post, Los Angeles Times, The Foreign Service Journal, The Journal of the Army War College, American Heritage, Military Review, and Cowboys & Indians Magazine. He was also a Contributing Editor to the Historical Dictionary of the U.S. Army and Oxford Companion to American Military History. and Armchair General magazine. He is the American correspondent for Military History Monthly (London). In 2011, his article at Wild West Magazine, "Taking Stock of the Pony Express," won the Western Heritage Award in the Magazine category. He has appeared on PBS' The American Experience and on the History Channel as a subject matter expert. He has also been a featured speaker at the National Press Club and numerous colleges, universities, and museums.

== Film and television ==
Chiaventone holds a master's degree in film and television production from San Francisco State University. He has written, produced, and directed documentaries and news programs for the Department of Defense. His expertise lies in military history, guerilla warfare, counter terrorism, peacekeeping operations, and broadcast media. Chiaventone was the historical advisor to film and television productions including, Ken Burns's The West, TNT's Rough Riders, and Two for Texas, which was the winner of the 1999 Western Heritage Award. He was the coach for principal actors and military and historical advisor for Ang Lee's Ride with the Devil. An expert on guerrilla warfare and counter-insurgency, he was interviewed along with President George H. W. Bush for the Salvadoran television program "Frente-a-Frente" by the correspondent Gisele Duarte.
