= No Gun Ri massacre =

1950 U.S. mass killing of civilians during the Korean War

- Part of the Korean War
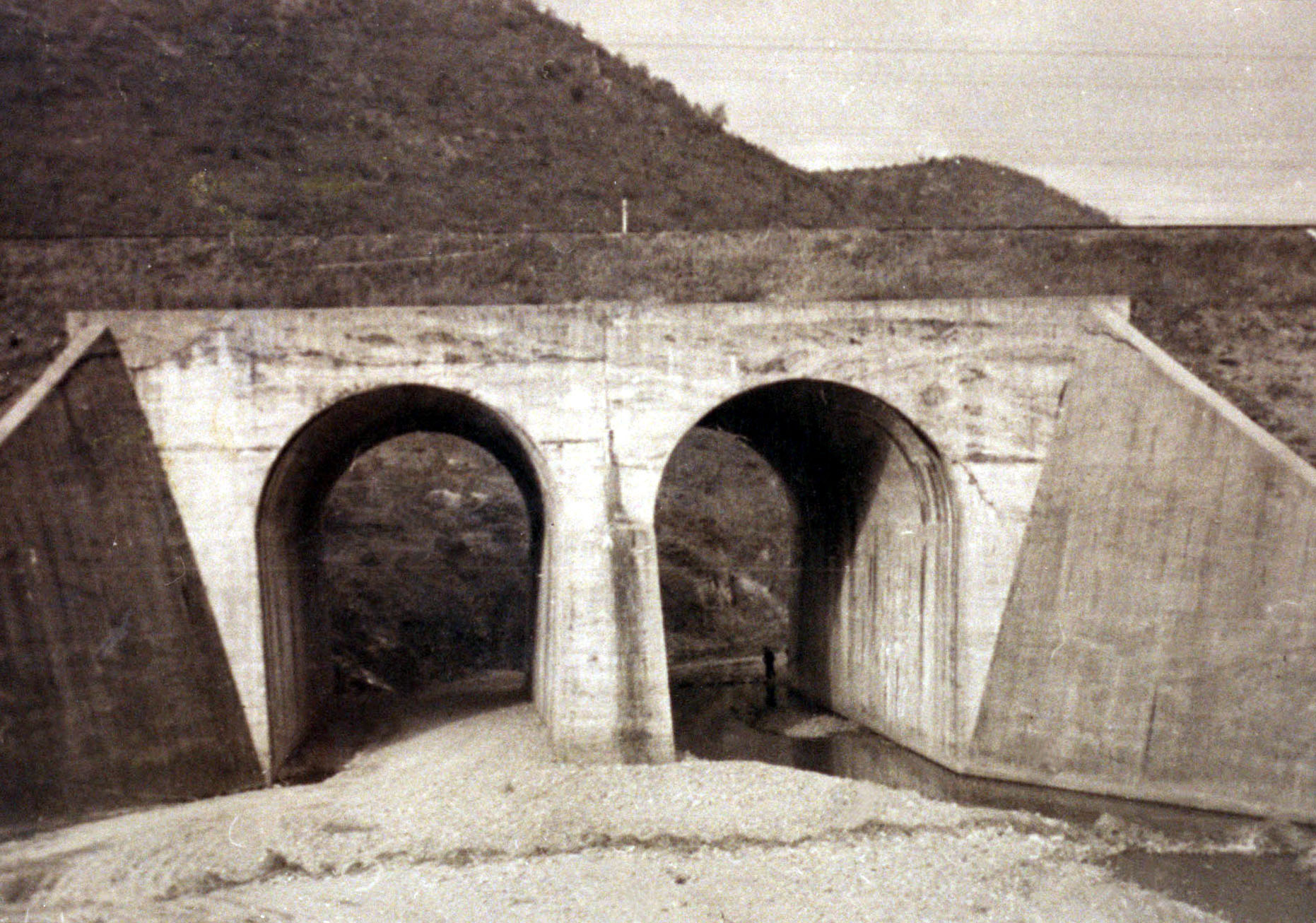
- The twin-underpass railroad bridge at No Gun Ri, South Korea, in 1960. Ten years earlier, members of the U.S. military killed a large number of South Korean refugees under and around the bridge, early in the Korean War.

- Location: 36°12′55″N 127°52′49″E; Nogeun-ri, South Korea (also known as No Gun Ri)
- Date: July 26–29, 1950 (76 years ago)
- Attack type: Shooting and air attack
- Deaths: At least 163 dead or missing, according to South Korea; About 400 dead, according to survivors Unknown, according to the U.S.
- Victim: South Korean refugees
- Perpetrators: 2nd Battalion, 7th Cavalry Regiment: Maj. Gen. Hobart R. Gay

The No Gun Ri massacre was a mass killing of South Korean civilian refugees by United States military air and ground forces near the village of Nogeun-ri (노근리) in central South Korea from July 26 to 29, 1950, during the US Army's retreat in the early phase of the Korean War. In 2005, a South Korean government inquest certified the names of 163 dead or missing and 55 wounded, and added that many other victims' names were not reported. The No Gun Ri Peace Foundation estimates 250–300 were killed, mostly women and children.

The incident was little known outside Korea until publication of an Associated Press (AP) story in 1999 in which veterans of the U.S. Army unit involved, the 7th Cavalry Regiment, corroborated survivors' accounts. The AP also uncovered declassified U.S. Army orders to fire on approaching civilians because of reports of North Korean infiltration of refugee groups. In 2001, the U.S. government conducted an investigation and, after previously rejecting survivors' claims, acknowledged the killings, but described the three-day event as "an unfortunate tragedy inherent to war and not a deliberate killing". Then-President Bill Clinton issued a statement of regret, adding the next day that "things happened which were wrong", but survivors' demands for an apology and compensation were rejected.

South Korean investigators disagreed with the U.S. report, saying they believed that 7th Cavalry troops were ordered to fire on the refugees. The survivors' group called the U.S. report a "whitewash" of a war crime. The AP later discovered additional archival documents showing that U.S. commanders ordered troops to "shoot" and "fire on" civilians at the war front during this period; these declassified documents had been found but not disclosed by the Pentagon investigators. Among the undisclosed documents was a letter from the U.S. ambassador in South Korea stating that the U.S. military had adopted a theater-wide policy of firing on approaching refugee groups. Despite demands, the U.S. investigation was not reopened.

Prompted by the exposure of No Gun Ri, survivors of similar alleged U.S. war crimes from 1950 to 1951 filed reports with the South Korean government. In 2008, an investigative commission said more than 200 cases of alleged large-scale killings by the U.S. military had been registered, mostly air attacks.

== Background ==
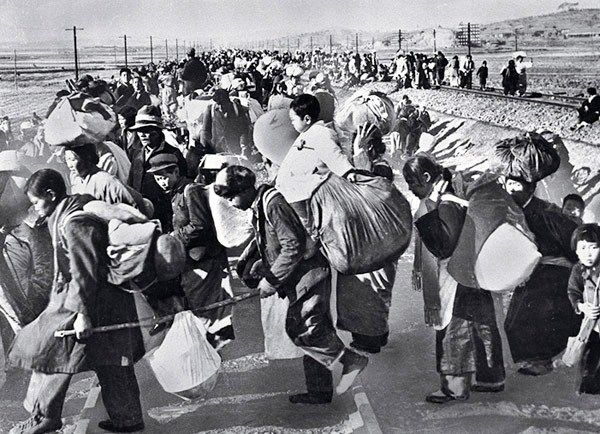
Huge numbers of South Koreans fled south in mid-1950 after the North Korean army invaded. By spring 1951, the U.S.-led U.N. command estimated 5 million South and North Koreans had become refugees.

The division of Japan's former Korean colony into two zones at the end of World War II led to years of border skirmishing between U.S.-allied South Korea (the "Republic of Korea") and Soviet-allied North Korea ("Democratic People's Republic of Korea"). On June 25, 1950, the Korean People's Army (KPA, North Korean Army) invaded the south to try to reunify the peninsula, beginning the Korean War.

The invasion caught South Korea and its American ally by surprise, and sent the defending South Korean forces into retreat. The U.S. moved troops from Japan to fight alongside the South Koreans. The first troops landed on July 1, and by July 22, three U.S. Army divisions were in Korea, including the 1st Cavalry Division. These American troops were insufficiently trained, poorly equipped, and often led by inexperienced officers. Of particular relevance was that they lacked training in dealing with war-displaced civilians. The combined U.S. and South Korean forces were initially unable to stop the North Korean advance, and continued to retreat throughout July.

In the two weeks following the first significant U.S. ground troop engagement on July 5, the U.S. Army estimated that 380,000 South Korean civilians fled south, passing through the retreating U.S. and South Korean lines. With gaps in their lines, U.S. forces were attacked from the rear, and reports spread that disguised North Korean soldiers were infiltrating refugee columns. Because of these concerns, orders were issued to fire on Korean civilians in front-line areas, orders discovered decades later in declassified military archives. Among those issuing the orders was 1st Cavalry Division commander Maj. Gen. Hobart R. Gay, who deemed Koreans left in the war zone to be "enemy agents", according to U.S. war correspondent O.H.P. King and U.S. diplomat Harold Joyce Noble. On the night of July 25, that division's 2nd Battalion, 7th Cavalry Regiment, (Note: The 2nd Battalion, 7th Cavalry Regiment, 1st Cavalry Division, Eighth U.S. Army, was composed of E, F, G, and H Companies) hearing of an enemy breakthrough, fled rearward from its forward positions, to be reorganized the next morning, digging in near the village of Nogeun-ri (also romanized as No Gun Ri), 100 miles southeast of Seoul. Later that day, on July 26, 1950, these troops saw hundreds of refugees approaching, many from the nearby villages of Chu Gok Ri and Im Ke Ri.

== Killings ==
=== Events of July 25 to 29, 1950 ===
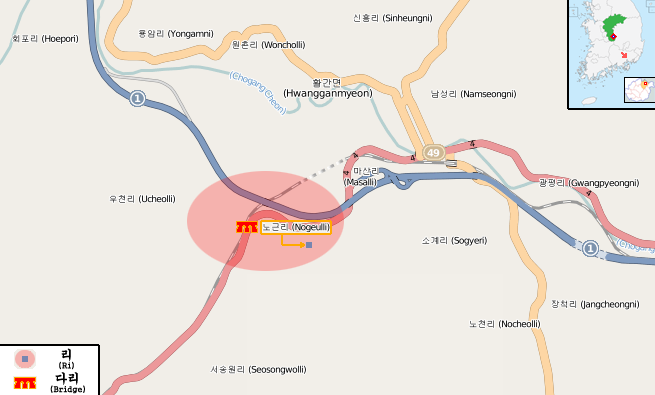
Map of No Geun Ri

On July 25, as North Korean forces seized the town of Yongdong, 7 miles (11 km) west of No Gun Ri, U.S. troops were evacuating nearby villages, including hundreds of residents of Chu Gok Ri and Im Ke Ri. These villagers were joined by others as they walked down the main road south, and the estimated 600 refugees spent the night by a riverbank near Ha Ga Ri village, 3.5 miles (5.5 km) west of No Gun Ri. Seven refugees were killed by U.S. soldiers when they strayed from the group during the night. In the morning of July 26, the villagers found that the escorting soldiers had left. They continued down the road, were stopped by American troops at a roadblock near No Gun Ri, and were ordered onto the parallel railroad tracks, where U.S. soldiers searched them and their belongings, confiscating knives and other items. The refugees were resting, spread out along the railroad embankment around midday, when military aircraft strafed and bombed them. Recalling the air strike, Yang Hae-chan, a 10-year-old boy in 1950, said the attacking planes returned repeatedly, and "chaos broke out among the refugees. We ran around wildly trying to get away." He and another survivor said that soldiers reappeared and began shooting the wounded on the tracks. Survivors first sought shelter in a small culvert beneath the tracks, but soldiers and U.S. ground fire drove them from there into a double tunnel beneath a concrete railroad bridge. Inside the bridge underpasses, each 80 feet (24 m) long, 22 feet (6.5 m) wide and 40 feet (12 m) high, they came under heavy machine gun and rifle fire from 7th Cavalry troops from both sides of the bridge. "The American soldiers played with our lives like boys playing with flies," said Chun Choon-ja, a 12-year-old girl at the time. "Children were screaming in fear and adults were praying for their lives, and the whole time they never stopped shooting," said survivor Park Sun-yong, whose 4-year-old son and 2-year-old daughter were killed, while she was badly wounded.

Two communications specialists, Larry Levine and James Crume, said they remembered orders to fire on the refugees coming to the 2nd Battalion command post from a higher level, probably from 1st Cavalry Division. They recalled the ground fire beginning with a mortar round landing among the refugee families, followed by what Levine called a "frenzy" of small-arms fire. Some battalion veterans recalled front-line company officers ordering them to open fire. "It was assumed there were enemy in these people," said ex-rifleman Herman Patterson. "They were dying down there. I could hear the people screaming," recalled Thomas H. Hacha of the sister 1st Battalion, observing nearby. Others said some soldiers held their fire.

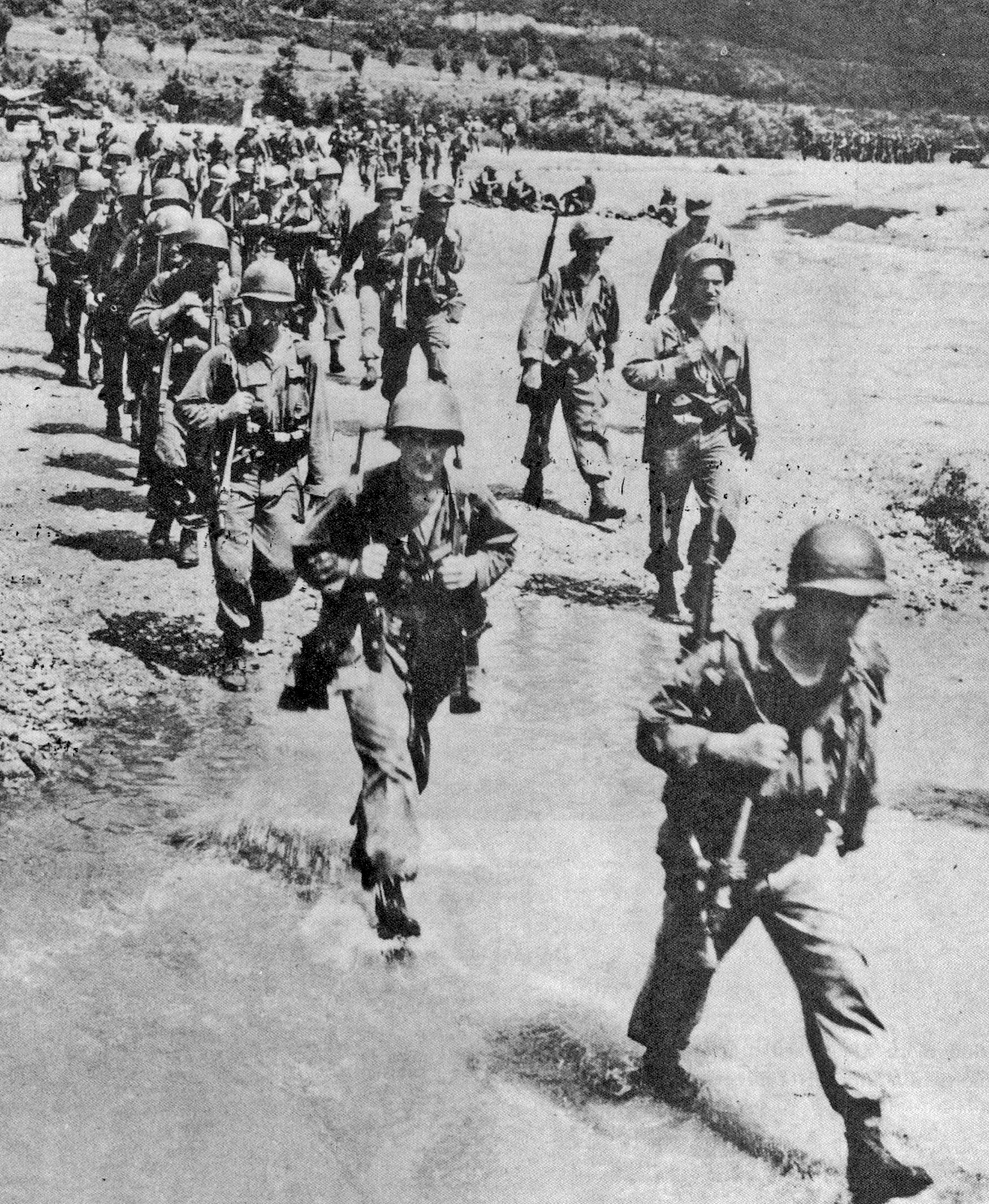
An unidentified unit of U.S. 1st Cavalry Division troops withdraws southward on July 29, 1950, the day that a division battalion pulled back from No Gun Ri after killing large numbers of trapped South Korean refugees there.

Trapped refugees began piling up bodies as barricades and tried to dig into the ground to hide. Some managed to escape that first night, while U.S. troops turned searchlights on the tunnels and continued firing, said Chung Koo-ho, whose mother died shielding him and his sister. By the second day, the gunfire was reduced to potshots and occasional fusillades when a trapped refugee moved or tried to escape. Some also recall planes returning that second day to fire rockets or drop bombs. Racked with thirst, survivors resorted to drinking blood-filled water from a small stream running under the bridge.

During the killings, the 2nd Battalion came under sporadic artillery and mortar fire from the North Koreans, who advanced cautiously from Yongdong. Declassified Army intelligence reports showed that the enemy front line was two miles or more from No Gun Ri late on July 28, the third day of the massacre. That night, the 7th Cavalry messaged division headquarters, "No important contact has been reported by our 2nd Battalion." The refugee killings were not reported in surviving unit documents. In the predawn hours of July 29, the 7th Cavalry Regiment withdrew from No Gun Ri. That afternoon, North Korean soldiers arrived outside the tunnels and helped those still alive, about two dozen, mostly children, feeding them and sending them back toward their villages.

=== Casualties ===
In the earliest published accounts of the killings, in August and September 1950, two North Korean journalists with the advancing northern troops reported finding an estimated 400 bodies in the No Gun Ri area, including 200 seen in one tunnel. The survivors generally put the death toll at 400, including 100 in the initial air attack, with scores more wounded. In Pentagon interviews in 2000, 7th Cavalry veterans' estimates of No Gun Ri dead ranged from dozens to 300. One who had a close look, career soldier Homer Garza, who led a patrol through one No Gun Ri tunnel, said that he saw 200 to 300 bodies piled up there.

In 2005, the South Korean government's Committee for the Review and Restoration of Honor for the No Gun Ri Victims, after a yearlong process of verifying claims through family registers, medical reports and other documents and testimony, certified the names of 150 No Gun Ri dead, 13 missing, and 55 wounded, including some who later died of their wounds. It said reports were not filed on many other victims because of the passage of time and other factors. Of the certified victims, 41 percent were children under 15, and 70 percent were women, children or men over age 61. The South Korean government-funded No Gun Ri Peace Foundation, which operates a memorial park and museum at the site, estimated in 2011 that 250–300 were killed.

== Aftermath ==
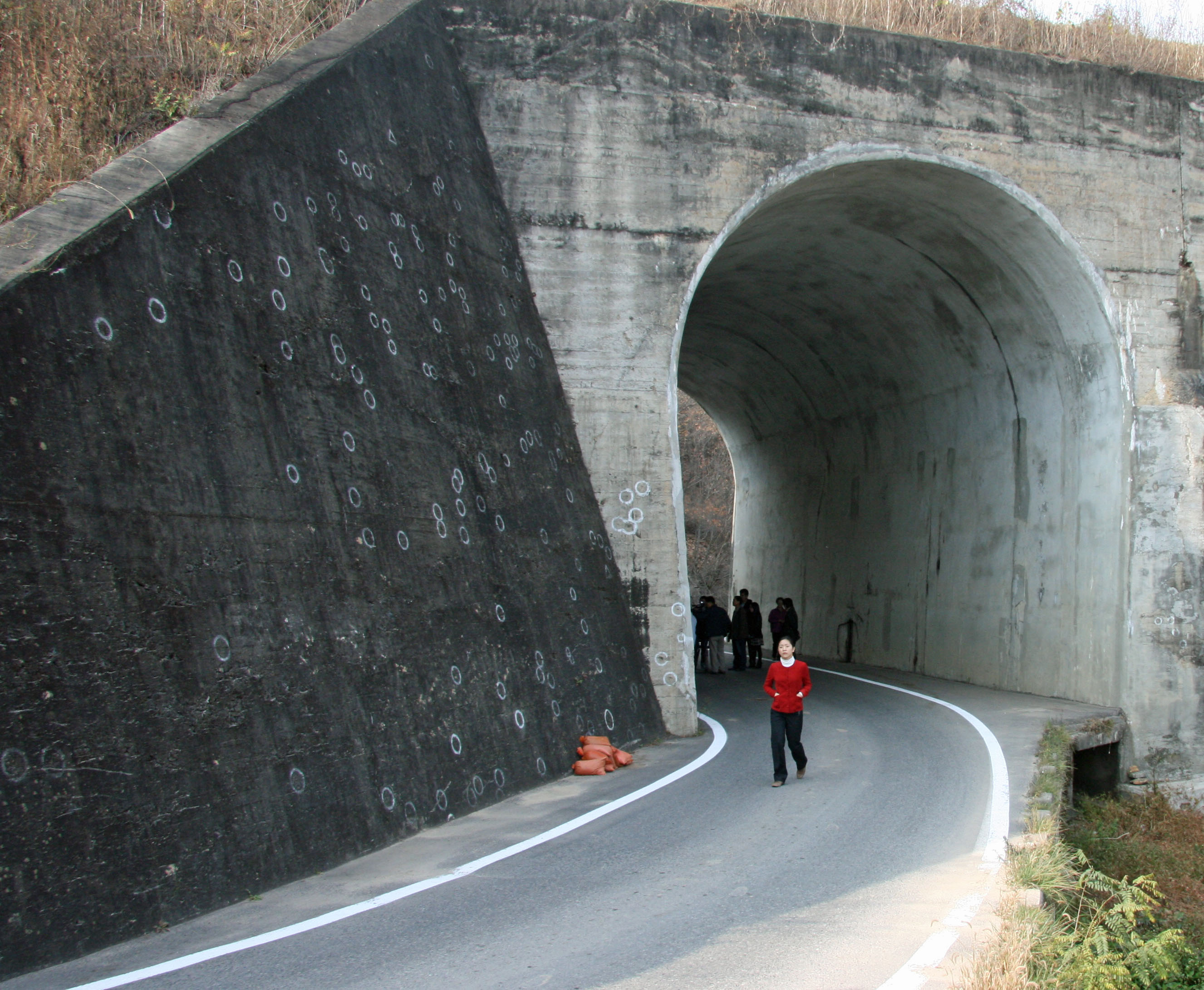
This 2008 photo shows a concrete abutment outside the No Gun Ri bridge, where investigators' white paint identifies bullet marks and embedded fragments from U.S. Army gunfire in the 1950 shooting of South Korean refugees.

Information about the refugee killings reached the U.S. command in Korea and the Pentagon by late August 1950, in the form of a captured and translated North Korean military document, which reported the discovery of the massacre. A South Korean agent for the U.S. counterintelligence command confirmed that account with local villagers weeks later, when U.S. troops moved back through the area, the ex-agent told U.S. investigators in 2000. Evidence of high-level knowledge also appeared in late September 1950 in a New York Times article from Korea, which reported, without further detail, that an unnamed high-ranking U.S. officer told the reporter of the "panicky" shooting of "many civilians" by a U.S. Army regiment that July. No evidence has emerged, however, that the U.S. military investigated the incident at the time.

=== Petitions ===
During the U.S.-supported postwar autocracy of President Syngman Rhee, survivors of No Gun Ri were too fearful of official retaliation to file public complaints. Survivor Yang Hae-chan said he was warned by South Korean police to stop telling others about the massacre. Following the April Revolution in 1960, which briefly established democracy in South Korea, former policeman Chung Eun-yong filed the first petition to the South Korean and U.S. governments. His two small children had been killed and his wife, Park Sun-yong, badly wounded at No Gun Ri. Over 30 petitions, calling for an investigation, apology, and compensation, were filed over the next decades, by Chung and later by a survivors' committee. Almost all were ignored, as was a petition to the U.S. and South Korean governments by the local Yongdong County Assembly.

It goes beyond comprehension why they attacked and killed them with such cruelty. The U.S. government should take responsibility.

— Excerpt from Chung's 1960 petition.

In 1994, Seoul newspapers reported on a book Chung published about the events of 1950, raising awareness of the allegations inside South Korea. In that same year, the U.S. Armed Forces Claims Service in Korea dismissed one No Gun Ri petition by asserting that any killings took place during combat. The survivors' committee retorted that there was no battle at No Gun Ri, but U.S. officials refused to reconsider.

In 1997, the survivors filed a claim with a South Korean compensation committee under the binational Status of Forces Agreement. This time, the U.S. claims service responded by again citing what it claimed was a combat situation, and by asserting that there was no evidence the 1st Cavalry Division was in the No Gun Ri area, as the survivors' research indicated (and as the 1961 official U.S. Army history of the war confirms).

On April 28, 1998, the Seoul government committee made a final ruling against the No Gun Ri survivors, citing the long-ago expiration of a five-year statute of limitations. In June 1998, South Korea's National Council of Churches, on behalf of the No Gun Ri survivors, sought help from the U.S. National Council of Churches, which quietly asked the Pentagon to investigate. In March 1999, the Army told the U.S. council that it had looked into the No Gun Ri allegations, and "found no information to substantiate the claim" in the operational records of the 1st Cavalry Division and other frontline units.

=== Associated Press story ===
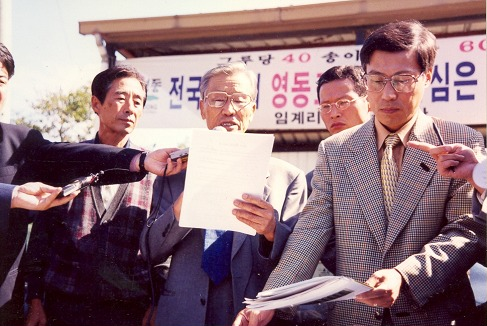
In October 1999, after release of the Associated Press report confirming the No Gun Ri refugee killings, Chung Eun-yong, leader of the survivors committee, reads a petition in Seoul, South Korea, calling for a "truthful and speedy" investigation.

Months before the Army's private correspondence with the church group, Associated Press reporters, researching those same 1950 operational records, found orders to shoot South Korean civilians. The U.S.-based news agency, which reported the rejection of the survivors' claim in April 1998, had begun investigating the No Gun Ri allegations earlier that year, trying to identify Army units possibly involved, and to track down their ex-soldiers. On September 29, 1999, after a year of internal struggle over releasing the article, the AP published its investigative report on the massacre, based on the accounts of 24 No Gun Ri survivors, corroborated by a dozen 7th Cavalry Regiment veterans. "We just annihilated them," it quoted former 7th Cavalry machine gunner Norman Tinkler as saying. The journalists' research into declassified military documents at the U.S. National Archives uncovered recorded instructions in late July 1950 that front-line units shoot South Korean refugees approaching their positions. (Note: The directives: 8th Cavalry Log, July 24, instructions to fire on approaching refugees, U.S. National Archives and Records Administration; 25th Infantry Division, July 27, Maj. Gen. Kean's order to treat civilians in war zone as enemy, U.S. National Archives and Records Administration; 25th Infantry Division, July 26, civilians in war zone will be shot, National Archives and Records Administration) A liaison officer of the sister 8th Cavalry Regiment had relayed word to his unit from 1st Cavalry Division headquarters to fire on refugees trying to cross U.S. front lines. Major General William B. Kean of the neighboring 25th Infantry Division advised that any civilians found in areas supposed to be cleared by police should be considered enemies and "treated accordingly", an order relayed by his staff as "considered as unfriendly and shot". On the day the No Gun Ri killings began, the Eighth Army ordered all units to stop refugees from crossing their lines. In subsequent articles, the AP reported that many more South Korean civilians were killed when the U.S. military blew up two Naktong River bridges packed with refugees on August 4, 1950, and when other refugee columns were strafed by U.S. aircraft in the war's first months.

The AP team (Sang-hun Choe, Charles J. Hanley, Martha Mendoza and Randy Herschaft) was awarded the 2000 Pulitzer Prize for Investigative Reporting for their reporting on No Gun Ri, along with receiving 10 other major national and international journalism awards.

Expanding on the AP's work, in June 2000, CBS News reported the existence of a U.S. Air Force memo from July 1950, in which the operations chief in Korea said the Air Force was strafing refugee columns approaching U.S. positions. (Note: Fifth Air Force, U.S. National Archives and Records Administration; Memo from Col. Turner C. Rogers noting the policy of strafing refugees.) The memo, dated July 25, the day before the No Gun Ri killings began with such a strafing, said the U.S. Army had requested the attacks on civilians, and "to date, we have complied with the army's request". A U.S. Navy document later emerged in which pilots from the aircraft carrier USS Valley Forge reported that the Army had told them to attack any groups of more than eight people in South Korea. (Note: USS Valley Forge operations report, U.S. Naval Historical Center) "Most fighter-bomber pilots regarded Korean civilians in white clothes as enemy troops," South Korean scholar Taewoo Kim would later conclude after reviewing Air Force mission reports from 1950.

In May 2000, challenged by a skeptical U.S. News & World Report magazine article, the AP team did additional archival research and reported that one of nine ex-soldiers quoted in the original No Gun Ri article, Edward L. Daily, had incorrectly identified himself as an eyewitness, and instead had been passing on second-hand information. A Pentagon spokesman said this would not affect an ongoing Army investigation of No Gun Ri, noting Daily was "just one guy of many we've been talking to". Army officer Robert Bateman, a 7th Cavalry veteran who collaborated on the U.S. News & World Report article with a fellow 7th Cavalry association member, later published a book, No Gun Ri: A Military History of the Korean War Incident, repeating his contentions that the AP reporting was flawed. The AP's methods and conclusions were defended by the AP in a lengthy, detailed refutation and by others. The Pulitzer committee reaffirmed its award and the credibility of the AP reporting.

=== U.S. and South Korean military investigations ===
On September 30, 1999, within hours of publication of the AP report, Defense Secretary William Cohen ordered Army Secretary Louis Caldera to initiate an investigation. The Seoul government also ordered an investigation, proposing that the two inquiries conduct joint document searches and joint witness interviews. The Americans refused.

In the ensuing 15-month probes, conducted by the U.S. Army inspector general's office and Seoul's defense ministry, interrogators interviewed or obtained statements from some 200 U.S. veterans and 75 Koreans. The Army researchers reviewed 1 million pages of U.S. archival documents. The final weeks were marked by press reports from Seoul of sharp disputes between the U.S. and Korean teams. On January 11, 2001, the two governments issued their separate reports.

==== U.S. report ====
After years of dismissing the allegations, the Army acknowledged in its report that the U.S. military had killed "an unknown number" of South Korean refugees at No Gun Ri with "small-arms fire, artillery and mortar fire, and strafing". However, it held that no orders were issued to fire on the civilians, and that the shootings were the result of hostile fire from among the refugees, or was firing meant to control them. At another point, it suggested that soldiers may have "misunderstood" the Eighth Army's stop-refugees order to mean they could be shot. At the same time, it described the deaths as "an unfortunate tragedy inherent to war and not a deliberate killing". The Army report dismissed the testimony of soldiers who spoke of orders to shoot at No Gun Ri because, it said, none could remember the wording, the originating officer's name, or having received the order directly himself.

The report questioned an early, unverified South Korean government estimate of 248 killed, missing, and wounded at No Gun Ri, citing an aerial reconnaissance photograph of the area, said to have been taken eight days after the killings ended, that it said showed "no indication of human remains or mass graves". Four years after this 2001 report, the Seoul government's inquest committee certified the identities of a minimum of 218 casualties.

==== South Korean report ====
In their report, South Korean investigators acknowledged that no documents showed specific orders at No Gun Ri to shoot refugees. However, they pointed to gaps in the U.S.-supplied documents dealing with 7th Cavalry and U.S. Air Force operations. Missing documents included the 7th Cavalry's journal, or communications log, for July 1950, the record that would have carried No Gun Ri orders. It was missing without explanation from its place at the National Archives.

The South Korean report said five former Air Force pilots told U.S. interrogators that they were directed to strafe civilians during this period, and 17 veterans of the 7th Cavalry testified that they believed there were orders to shoot the No Gun Ri refugees. The Koreans noted that two of the veterans were battalion communications specialists (Levine and Crume) and, as such, were in an especially good position to know which orders had been relayed. Citing the Eighth Army order of July 26 to stop refugees, the Korean report concluded that the 7th Cavalry was "likely to have used all possible means to stop the approaching refugees". Said South Korea's national security director, Oh Young-ho, "We believe there was an order to fire." A joint U.S.-Korean "Statement of Mutual Understandings" issued with the reports did not repeat the U.S. report's flat assertion that no orders to shoot were issued at No Gun Ri.

The Korean investigators cast doubt on the U.S. report's suggestion of possible gunfire from among the refugees. Surviving documents said nothing about infiltrators at No Gun Ri, even though they would have been the 7th Cavalry's first enemy killed-in-action in Korea. The No Gun Ri survivors denied it emphatically, and only three of 52 battalion veterans interviewed by the U.S. team spoke of hostile fire, and then inconsistently.

Regarding the aerial imagery that the U.S. report said suggested a lower death toll, the South Korean investigators, drawing on accounts from survivors and area residents, said at least 62 bodies had been taken away by relatives or buried in soldiers' abandoned foxholes in the first days after the killings, and others remained inside one underpass tunnel, under thin layers of dirt, out of sight of airborne cameras and awaiting later burial in mass graves. In addition, South Korean military specialists questioned the U.S. reconnaissance photos, pointing out irregularities, including the fact that the No Gun Ri frames had been spliced into the roll of film, raising the possibility they were not, as claimed, from August 6, 1950, eight days after the killings.

==== Clinton statement, U.S. offer ====
On the day the U.S. report was issued, President Bill Clinton issued a statement declaring, "I deeply regret that Korean civilians lost their lives at No Gun Ri in late July, 1950". The next day, he told reporters that "things happened which were wrong". However, the U.S. did not offer the apology and individual compensation sought by the survivors and the South Korean government. (Note: Clinton, William J. 2001. Statement on the Korean War incident at No Gun Ri. Washington, D.C.: Presidential Papers, Administration of William J. Clinton. January 11. Retrieved January 14, 2012) Instead, the U.S. offered a $4 million plan for a memorial at No Gun Ri, and a scholarship fund. The survivors later rejected the plan, because the memorial would be dedicated to all the war's South Korean civilian dead, rather than just the No Gun Ri victims.

=== Reaction to U.S. report; further evidence emerges ===
The No Gun Ri survivors' committee called the U.S. Army report a "whitewash" of command responsibility for a war crime. "This is not enough for the massacre of over 60 hours, of 400 innocent people who were hunted like animals," said committee head Chung Eun-yong. The survivors rejected the notion that the killings were "not deliberate", pointing to accounts from veterans and to documents attesting to front-line orders to shoot civilians. Lawmakers of both the ruling and opposition party in South Korea criticized the U.S. position.

Former U.S. congressman Pete McCloskey of California, the only one of eight outside advisers to the U.S. inquiry to write a detailed analysis afterward, agreed with the Koreans, saying, "I thought the Army report was a whitewash." In a letter to Defense Secretary Cohen, another U.S. adviser, retired Marine general Bernard E. Trainor, expressed sympathy with the hard-pressed U.S. troops of 1950, but said the killings were unjustified, and that "the American command was responsible for the loss of innocent civilian life in or around No-Gun-Ri."

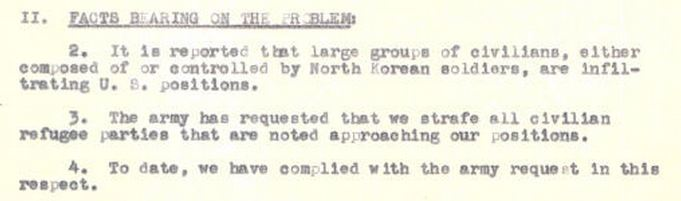
In this excerpt from a July 25, 1950, memo, the U.S. Air Force operations chief in Korea, Col. Turner C. Rogers, reports that U.S. aircraft are strafing South Korean refugees at the U.S. Army's request, because of reports of North Korean infiltrators disguising themselves as civilians. The Army's 2001 investigative report on the No Gun Ri refugee massacre excluded this passage from its description of the memo. Full text.

Journalists and scholars subsequently noted that the U.S. report either did not address or presented incomplete versions of key declassified documents, some previously reported in the news media. News reports pointed out that the U.S. review, in describing the July 1950 Air Force memo, did not acknowledge that it said refugees were being strafed at the Army's request. Researchers found that the U.S. review had not disclosed the existence of U.S. Air Force mission reports (Note: The mission reports: No Gun Ri 01 – USAF July 20 – Refugees strafed; No Gun Ri 02 – USAF July 20 – Refugees strafed; No Gun Ri 03 – USAF July 31 – Refugees strafed; No Gun Ri 08 – USAF July 26 – Air strike; No Gun Ri 09 – USAF July 26 – Air strike; No Gun Ri 10 – USAF July 27 – Air strike) during this period documenting the strafing of apparent refugee groups and air strikes in the No Gun Ri vicinity. The report did not address the commanders' July 26–27, 1950, instructions in the 25th Infantry Division saying that civilians in the war zone would be considered unfriendly and shot. In saying no such orders were issued at No Gun Ri, the Army did not disclose that the 7th Cavalry log, which would have held such orders, was missing from the National Archives.

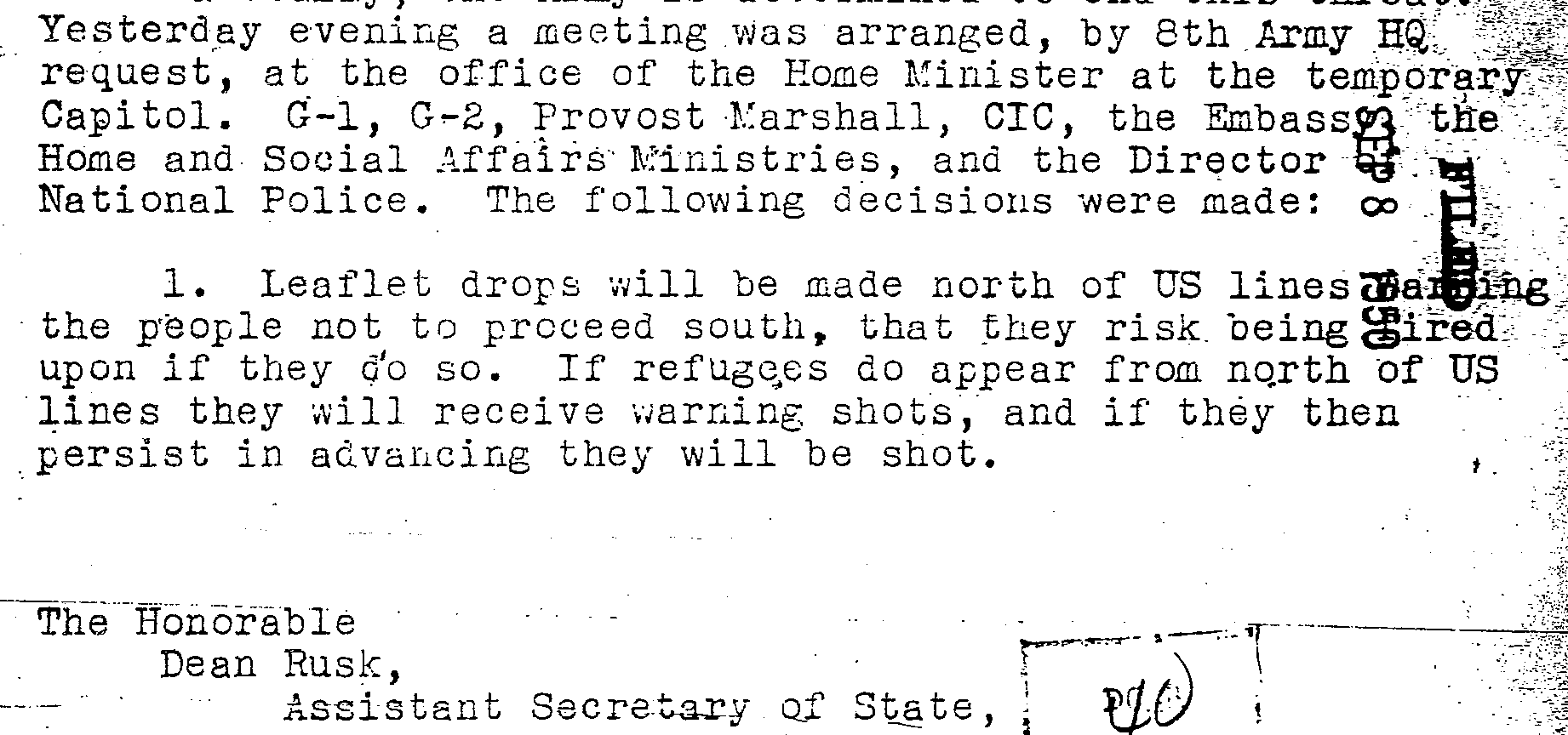
In this excerpt from a 1950 letter to Dean Rusk, John J. Muccio, U.S. ambassador to South Korea, informs the assistant secretary of state that the U.S. Army has decided to fire on South Korean refugees approaching U.S. lines despite warning shots. The letter, dated July 26, the day that the Army's 7th Cavalry Regiment began shooting refugees at No Gun Ri, was deliberately omitted from the Army's 2001 investigative report on No Gun Ri. Full text:

After the Army issued its report, it was learned that it also had not disclosed its researchers' discovery of at least 14 additional declassified documents showing high-ranking commanders ordering or authorizing the shooting of refugees in the Korean War's early months, such as communications from 1st Cavalry Division commander Gay and a top division officer to consider refugees north of the front line "fair game" and to "shoot all refugees coming across river". In addition, interview transcripts obtained through Freedom of Information Act requests showed that the Army had not reported repeated testimony from ex-soldiers that, as one put it, "the word I heard was 'Kill everybody from 6 to 60'" during their early days in Korea.

In 2005, American historian Sahr Conway-Lanz reported his discovery of a declassified document at the National Archives in which the United States Ambassador to Korea in 1950, John J. Muccio, notified the State Department on the day the No Gun Ri killings began that the U.S. military, fearing infiltrators, had adopted a policy of shooting South Korean refugee groups that approached U.S. lines despite warning shots. Pressed by the South Korean government, the Pentagon eventually acknowledged it deliberately omitted the Muccio letter from its 2001 report.

=== Law of war and No Gun Ri ===
In disclaiming U.S. culpability in January 2001, then-President Clinton told reporters, "The evidence was not clear that there was responsibility for wrongdoing high enough in the chain of command in the Army to say that, in effect, the government was responsible". American lawyers for the No Gun Ri survivors rejected that rationale, asserting that whether 7th Cavalry troops acted under formal orders or not, the No Gun Ri killings were a war crime: "The massacre of civilian refugees, mainly the elderly, women and children, was in and of itself a clear violation of international law for which the United States is liable under the doctrine of command responsibility and must pay compensation". Writing to the Army inspector general's office in May 2001, the lawyers also pointed out that numerous orders were issued at the war front to shoot civilians, and said the U.S. military's self-investigation – "allowing enforcement to be subject to the unbridled discretion of the alleged perpetrator" – was an ultimate violation of victims' rights.

The South Korean government's inquest panel, the Committee for the Review and Restoration of Honor for the No Gun Ri Victims, concluded in its 2005 report, "The United States of America should take responsibility for the No Gun Ri incident", citing six South Korean legal studies as saying that No Gun Ri constituted a crime against humanity.

In one such study, legal scholar Tae-Ung Baik noted that the 1907 Hague Convention, the relevant international treaty in 1950, seemed to exclude civilians victimized by an allied nation's military, as with the South Koreans at No Gun Ri, from treaty "protected" status, leaving prosecution to local or military law. But Baik also contended any mass killing of noncombatants remained a crime under "customary international law." American soldiers sent to Korea in 1950 were issued a booklet telling them the Hague treaty forbade targeting civilians. "Hostilities are restricted to the armed forces of belligerents," it said.

American experts in military law said prosecuting ex-soldiers a half-century after No Gun Ri, under the relevant U.S. military law from 1950, the Articles of War, was a practical impossibility. Nevertheless, Army Secretary Caldera said early in the investigation that he could not rule out prosecutions, a statement that survivors later complained may have deterred some 7th Cavalry veterans from testifying.

== Later developments ==
=== Continuing appeals ===
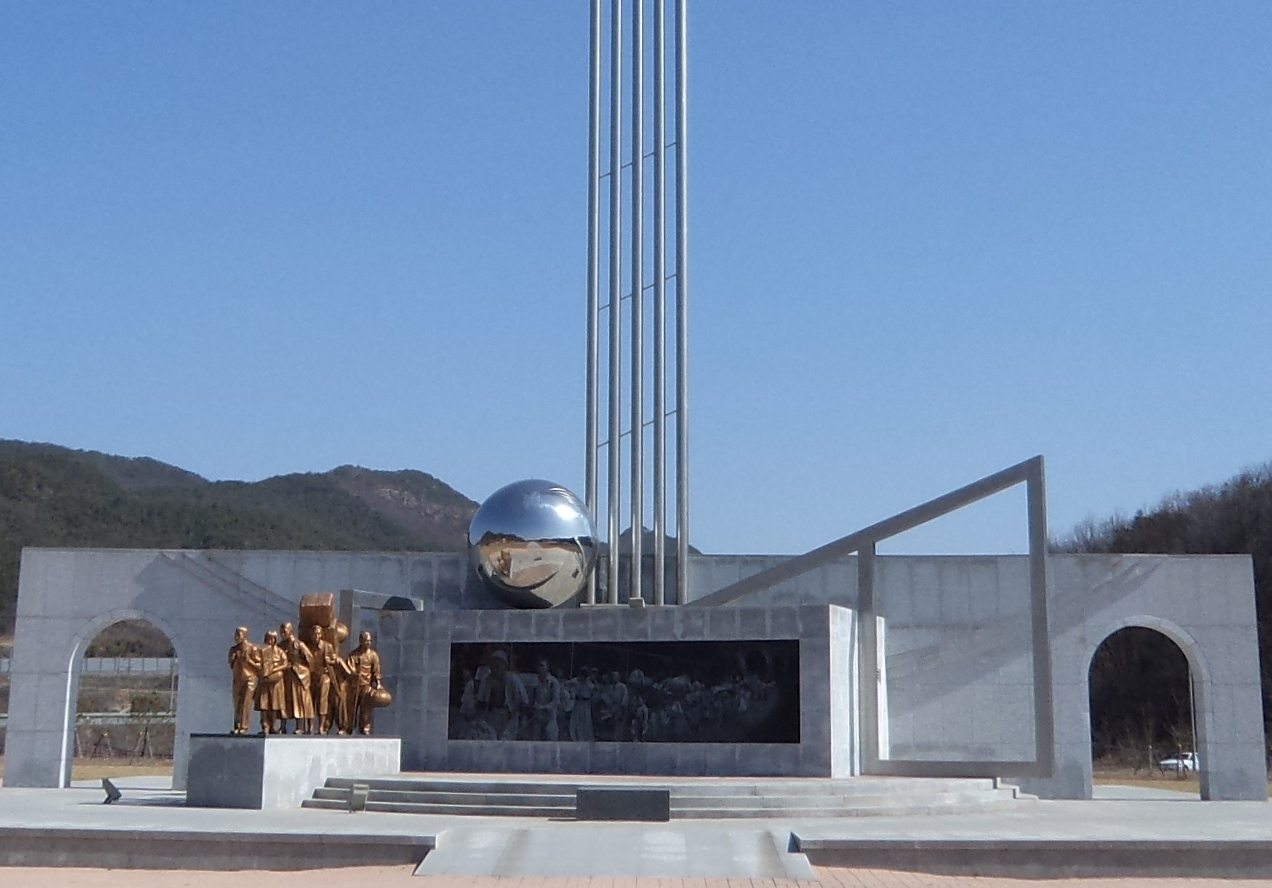
The Memorial Tower in the No Gun Ri Memorial Peace Park, with its three- and two-dimensional depictions of the refugees of 1950, and two arches representing the No Gun Ri tunnel entrances. The 33-acre (13 ha) park, adjacent to the massacre site in Yongdong County in central South Korea, opened in October 2011. It also contains a museum and a peace education center.

Although often supported by South Korean politicians and newspaper editorials, the No Gun Ri survivors' repeated demands for a reopened U.S. investigation and compensation went unheeded. Meeting with South Korean officials in 2001, the survivors asked that their government seek action at the International Court of Justice at The Hague, and in U.N. human rights forums, but were rebuffed. In 2002, a spokesman for South Korea's then-governing party called for a new U.S. inquiry, but the Defense Ministry later warned the National Assembly that a reopened probe might damage U.S.–South Korean relations.

The disclosure in 2006 that Pentagon investigators had omitted the Muccio letter from their final report, along with other incriminating documents and testimony, prompted more calls for action. Two leaders of the National Assembly appealed to U.S. Senator (and future president) Joseph R. Biden, chairman of the U.S. Senate Foreign Relations Committee, for a joint investigation, but no U.S. congressional body ever took up the No Gun Ri issue. In a 2015 book, David Straub, U.S. Embassy political chief during the No Gun Ri investigation, wrote that meeting the survivors' demands would have set an undesirable precedent for similar cases from 1950 Korea. After a delegation's visit to No Gun Ri, the annual General Assembly of the US Presbyterian Church adopted a resolution in June 2016 calling on church leadership to urge the U.S. president and Congress to issue an apology and appropriate compensation for the No Gun Ri killings.

=== Graves, memorial park ===
No Gun Ri villagers said that in later decades two mass graves holding some victims' remains were disturbed, that bones were removed during a reforestation project and by farming activity. In 2007, excavations at several places near the bridge turned up little. The forensics team said it hadn't found more because so much time had passed and any remains had been exposed to the elements and soil erosion, railway work, cultivation, and highly acidic soil.

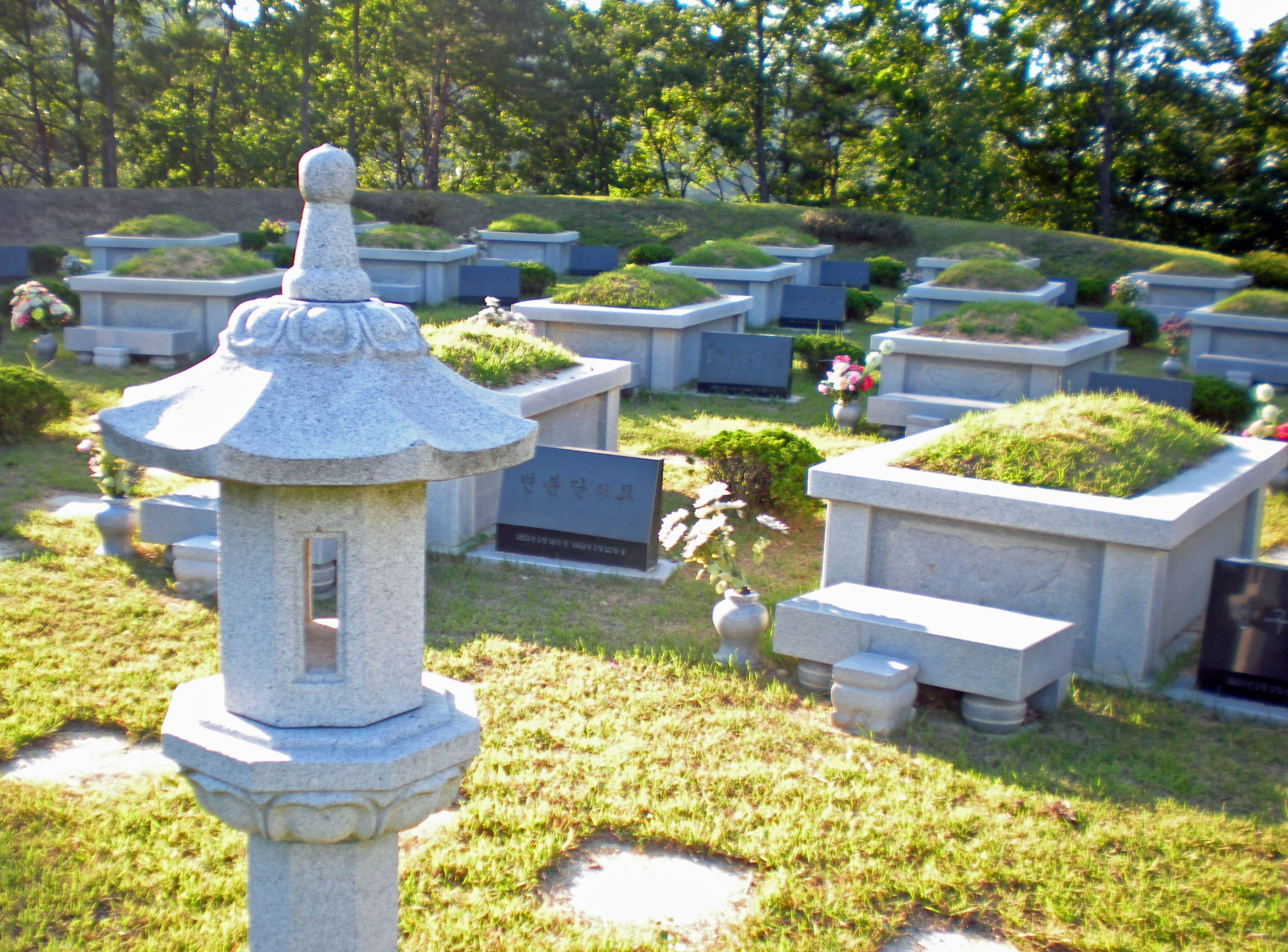
This cemetery, opened in 2009, holds remains of some victims of the 1950 refugee massacre at No Gun Ri. It occupies a hilltop above the No Gun Ri Memorial Peace Park.

After the United States refused to offer compensation and the survivors rejected the plan for a war memorial and scholarship fund, South Korea's National Assembly on February 9, 2004, adopted a "Special Act on the Review and Restoration of Honor for the No Gun Ri Victims". It established the committee that examined and certified the identities of the dead and wounded, and it provided medical subsidies for surviving wounded. The act also envisioned a memorial park at the No Gun Ri site, which had begun attracting 20,000 to 30,000 visitors a year. The 33-acre (13-ha.) No Gun Ri Memorial Peace Park, built with $17 million in government funds and featuring a memorial, museum, and peace education center, opened in October 2011. In 2009, Yongdong County established a nearby cemetery, to which some victims' remains were moved from family plots. A publicly financed No Gun Ri International Peace Foundation also sponsored an annual peace conference, a No Gun Ri Peace Prize, and a summer peace camp at the park for international university students.

=== No Gun Ri in culture ===
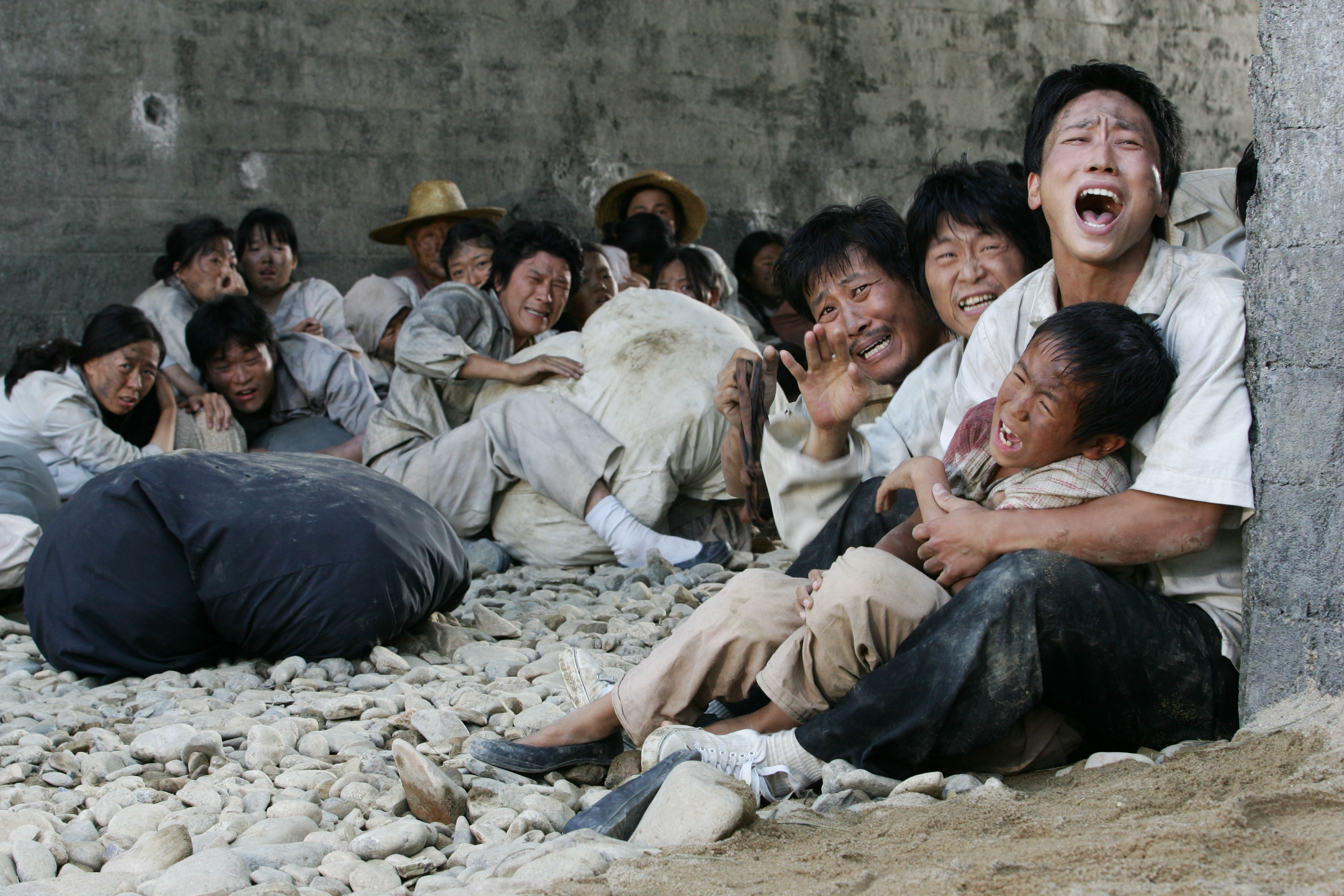
A depiction of the scene under the No Gun Ri bridge from the 2009 South Korean feature film A Little Pond.

In South Korea, the No Gun Ri story inspired works of nonfiction, fiction, theater, and other arts. In 2010, a major Korean studio, Myung Films, released a No Gun Ri feature film, A Little Pond, written and directed by Lee Saang-woo and featuring Song Kang-ho, Moon So-ri and other Korean stars who donated their work. Besides commercial release in South Korea, the movie was screened at international film festivals, including in New York and London.

In 2006–2010, artist Park Kun-woong and Chung Eun-yong published Nogunri Story, a two-volume graphic narrative that told the story of the massacre and the half-century struggle for the truth through thousands of drawings, based on Chung's 1994 book. The Korean-language work was also published in translation in Europe. In the United States and Britain, No Gun Ri was a central or secondary theme in six English-language novels, including the U.S. National Book Award finalist Lark & Termite of 2009, by Jayne Anne Phillips, the James Bond thriller Trigger Mortis of 2015, by British author Anthony Horowitz.

=== Truth and Reconciliation Commission ===
The 1999 No Gun Ri articles prompted hundreds of South Koreans to come forward to report other alleged incidents of large-scale civilian killings by the U.S. military in 1950–1951, mostly in the form of air attacks. In 2005, the National Assembly created the Truth and Reconciliation Commission of the Republic of Korea to investigate these allegations, as well as other human rights violations in southern Korea during the 20th century. The commission's docket eventually held more than 200 cases of what it described as "civilian massacre committed by U.S. soldiers".

By 2009, the commission's work of collating declassified U.S. military documents with survivors' accounts confirmed eight representative cases of what it found were wrongful U.S. killings of hundreds of South Korean civilians, including refugees crowded into a cave attacked with napalm bombs, and those at a shoreline refugee encampment deliberately shelled by a U.S. warship.

The commission alleged that the U.S. military repeatedly conducted indiscriminate attacks, failing to distinguish between combatants and non-combatants. In its most significant finding, the commission also confirmed that South Korean authorities had summarily executed thousands of suspected leftists in South Korea – possibly 100,000 to 200,000 – in the Bodo League massacre at the outbreak of the war, sometimes with U.S. Army officers present and taking photographs.

Of all American wars, the Korean War is believed to have been the deadliest for civilians as a proportion of those killed, including North and South Korean non-combatants killed in extensive U.S. Air Force bombing throughout Korea, and South Korean civilians summarily executed by the invading North Korean military. The commission also recommended that the Seoul government negotiate with the United States for reparations for large-scale civilian killings by the U.S. military. This did not occur. At the outset of the No Gun Ri investigation in 1999, Defense Secretary Cohen said in Washington and Assistant U.S. Secretary of State Stanley Roth was quoted as saying in Seoul that the United States would consider investigating any similar Korean War killings that came to light, However, the 1999–2001 investigation was the last conducted by the United States.

== See also ==
- Korean War
- War crime
- My Lai massacre
- Bombing of North Korea
- The Bridge at No Gun Ri: A Hidden Nightmare of the Korean War (Book by the Pulitzer Prize-winning AP journalists who broke the story)
- History of Korea
- History of South Korea
- List of massacres in South Korea
- Massacre in Korea, a painting by Pablo Picasso, depicting the No Gun Ri massacre
- Sinchon Massacre
- Anti-American sentiment in Korea
- Anti-communist mass killings
- December massacres
- Ganghwa massacre
- Geochang massacre
- Bodo League massacre
- Goyang Geumjeong Cave massacre
- Mungyeong massacre
- Namyangju massacre
- Sancheong–Hamyang massacre
- Yeosu–Suncheon rebellion
- Jeju uprising
