= R. Alan King =

- Born: May 8, 1963 (age 63); Arlington, Virginia
- Military career
- Allegiance: United States of America
- Branch: United States Army Reserve
- Service years: 1983-2011
- Rank: Colonel
- Conflicts: Iraqi Freedom Iraq (2003–2004); Just Cause Panama (1989)
- Awards: Bronze Star Medal w/ Valor Device (2 Awards); Bronze Star Medal (2 Awards)
- Other work: CEO and President, Consequence Management, Inc.

R. Alan King (born May 8, 1963) is an American soldier and award-winning author. He is a retired colonel, U.S. Army Reserve. He was awarded two Bronze Star Medals with Valor device and under his command, the 422 Civil Affairs Battion received the Presidential Unit Citation during "Operation Iraqi Freedom."

== Early life ==
Born on May 8, 1963, in Arlington, Virginia, King grew up in northern Virginia. As a child, he moved with his family to Woodbridge, Virginia, and in 1981 he graduated from Woodbridge High School (Virginia) in Woodbridge, Virginia.

== Academics, honors and awards ==
King graduated from East Tennessee State University with a BS in criminal justice in 1987 and from Webster University with a Master of Arts in international relations and management in 1997. King graduated from the U.S. Air Force Air War College in 2002. He is pursuing a doctorate from the University of Southern Mississippi in International Development.

He authored the book Twice Armed: An American Soldier's Battle for Hearts and Minds in Iraq, Zenith Press 2006, that won the 2008 William E. Colby Award for significant contributions to international relations and intelligence operations.

King was recognized by Oklahoma State University for outstanding contributions to the political issues in Iraq and designated an honorary Henery G. Bennett Distinguished Fellow in 2007.

On September 11, 2006, King testified before the House of Representatives, Subcommittee for National Security on the security situation in Iraq.

== Military career ==
King enlisted in the Maryland Army National Guard as an infantryman in 1983. He was commissioned Infantry in the Army Reserve in 1985 and then into the Regular Army in the Adjutant General Corps in 1987. He served with the XVIII Airborne Corps and later in the 7th Special Forces Group (Abn) deploying in support of "Operation Just Cause". King transferred into the Army Reserve in 1991 and branch transferred into Civil Affairs. He served as the Assistant Chief of Staff for Personnel, United States Army Civil Affairs and Psychological Operations Command (Abn) from 1992 to 1997. King then attended the Psychological Operations Officers Course and commanded the 310th PSYOP Company in Georgia. He assumed command of the 422d Civil Affairs Battalion in July 2001. King served as the senior civil-military advisor to the 3rd Infantry Division during "Operation Iraqi Freedom" and received two Bronze Star Medals for Valor and two Bronze Star Medals for achievement (2003–2004). He and the 422d Civil Affairs Battalion were credited with capturing three individuals from the infamous "Deck of Cards," and almost a dozen of the top 200 most wanted, including "Baghdad Bob" and the Chairman of Atomic Energy. While under his command, the 422d Civil Affairs Battalion was awarded the Presidential Unit Citation for Operation Iraqi Freedom. Several Civil Affairs teams from the battalion were under the tactical control of maneuver units from the 3rd Infantry Division.
