= Waging War: The Clash Between Presidents and Congress, 1776 to ISIS =

2016 book by David J. Barron

- First edition
- Author: David J. Barron
- Genre: military history, political history
- Publisher: Simon & Schuster
- Publication date: 2016
- Media type: Print, Ebook
- Pages: xiv, 560 pages
- Awards: Colby Award
- ISBN: 978-1-4516-8197-0 (Hardcover)
- OCLC: 944380362

Waging War: The Clash Between Presidents and Congress, 1776 to ISIS is a book written by David J. Barron and published in 2016 by Simon & Schuster. It was the 2017 recipient of the Colby Award.
