= Dexter Filkins =

American journalist and war correspondent (born 1961)

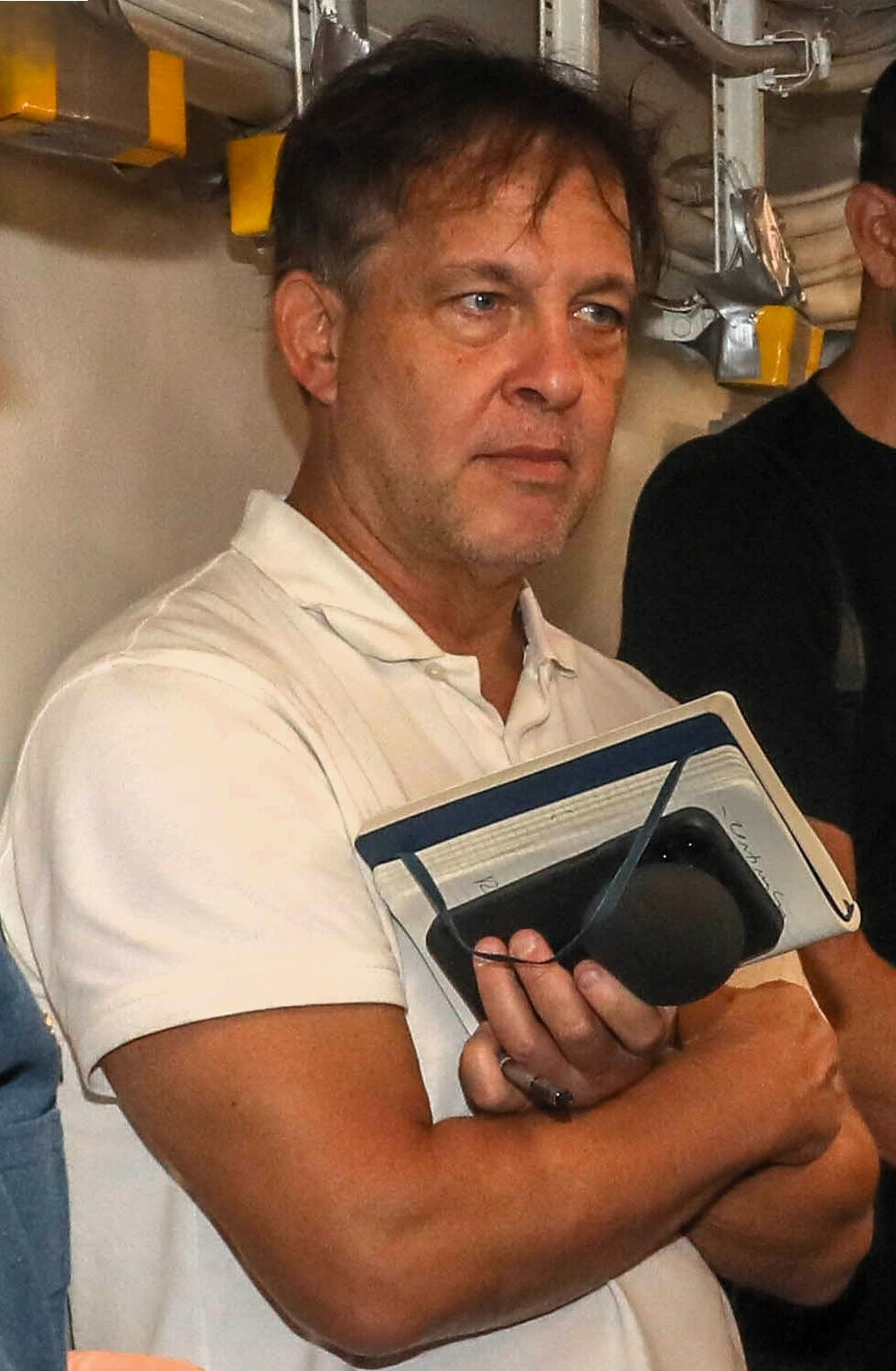
- Filkins on the USS Rafael Peralta in 2023
- Born: Dexter Price Filkins; May 24, 1961 (age 65); Cincinnati, Ohio, U.S.
- Education: St Antony's College, Oxford (MPhil); Univ. of Florida (BA 1983)
- Occupations: journalist, author
- Notable work: The Forever War
- Awards: Pulitzer Prize; 2009 The New York Times – International Reporting

Dexter Price Filkins (born May 24, 1961) is an American journalist known primarily for his coverage of the wars in Iraq and Afghanistan for The New York Times. He was a finalist for a Pulitzer Prize in 2002 for his dispatches from Afghanistan, and won a Pulitzer in 2009 as part of a team of Times reporters for their dispatches from Pakistan and Afghanistan. In 2009, The Washington Post described him as "the premier combat journalist of his generation." He currently writes for The New Yorker.

== Background ==
Filkins was born in Cincinnati, Ohio, but grew up in Florida after his parents divorced. He has a sister and an older brother.

Filkins received a B.A. in political science from the University of Florida in 1983, and an M.Phil. in international relations from St Antony's College, Oxford, in 1984.

== Career ==
Before joining the Times in September 2000, Filkins worked at the Miami Herald and later served as New Delhi bureau chief for the Los Angeles Times for three years.

He reported from The New York Times' Baghdad bureau in Iraq from 2003 to 2006.

In 2006–2007, Filkins was at Harvard University on a Nieman Fellowship; in 2007–2008, he was a Fellow at the Carr Center for Human Rights Policy at the Harvard Kennedy School.

Filkins's book, The Forever War (2008), chronicling his experiences in Afghanistan and Iraq, was a New York Times best-seller. The Forever War won the National Book Critics Circle Award for best nonfiction book of 2008, and was named one of the best nonfiction books of the year by, among others, The New York Times, Amazon.com, The Washington Post, Time, and the Boston Globe.

Filkins joined The New Yorker in 2011.

In 2018, Filkins reported on unusual internet traffic involving a Trump Organization server and Russia's Alfa Bank. Subsequent media analysis noted that FBI investigators found no substantiated link; Columbia Journalism Review later described the Alfa-Bank claims as having been debunked by investigators.

== Awards ==
Filkins has received two George Polk Awards. According to Long Island University, his 2004 award recognized reporting from the November 2004 assault on Fallujah in Iraq; he shared another Polk in 2011 (with Mark Mazzetti) for coverage of Afghanistan and Pakistan.

Filkins has won two National Magazine Awards; in 2009, for his story, "Right At the Edge," and in 2011 for "Bedrooms of the Fallen," an essay with the photographer Ashley Gilbertson. Both appeared in the New York Times Magazine.

Filkins' article "Right at the Edge" (September 7, 2008) was part of the body of work by the staff of The New York Times awarded the 2009 Pulitzer Prize for distinguished reporting on international affairs.

In 2010, his reporting for The New York Times from Iraq and Afghanistan, alongside the work of photographer Tyler Hicks and reporter C. J. Chivers, was selected by New York University as one of the "Top Ten Works of Journalism of the Decade".

He has also received multiple Overseas Press Club awards.

== Bibliography ==
=== Books ===
- Filkins, Dexter (2008). The forever war. New York: Alfred A. Knopf.

=== Essays and reporting ===
- Filkins, Dexter (October 23, 2005). "The fall of the warrior king". Magazine. The New York Times.
- — (November 9, 2006). "Where Plan A left Ahmad Chalabi". Magazine. The New York Times.
- — (October 7, 2007). "Regrets Only?". The New York Times Magazine.
- — (March 21, 2010). "The Shrine Down The Hall". The New York Times Magazine. pp. 34–47.
- — (September 12, 2011). "The journalist and the spies". The New Yorker.
- — (July 9, 2012). "After America: Will civil war hit Afghanistan when the U.S. leaves?". A Reporter at Large. The New Yorker. 88 (20): 54–67.
- — (October 29, 2012). "Atonement". A Reporter at Large. The New Yorker. 88 (34): 92.
- — (February 25, 2013). "After Syria : if the Assad regime falls, can Hezbollah survive?". A Reporter at Large. The New Yorker. 89 (2): 48–57.
- — (May 13, 2013). "The thin red line : inside the White House debate over Syria". A Reporter at Large. The New Yorker. 89 (13): 40–49.
- — (September 30, 2013). "The shadow commander : Qassem Suleimani is the Iranian operative who has been reshaping the Middle East. Now he's directing Assad's war in Syria". A Reporter at Large. The New Yorker. 89 (30): 42–53.
- — (September 29, 2014). "The Fight Of Their Lives". A Reporter at Large. The New Yorker. 90 (29): 42.
- — (July 20, 2015). "Death of a prosecutor". A Reporter at Large. The New Yorker. 91 (20): 38–51.
- — (March 7, 2016). "A truce in Syria". The Talk of the Town. Comment. The New Yorker. 92 (4): 17–18.
- — (January 2, 2017). "Before the flood : a failing dam threatens millions of Iraqis". A Reporter at Large. The New Yorker. 92 (43): 22–28. (Note: Online version is titled "A bigger problem than ISIS?".) Mosul Dam.
- — (October 15, 2018). "Was There a Connection Between a Russian Bank and the Trump Campaign? A team of computer scientists sifted through records of unusual Web traffic in search of answers". A Reporter at Large. The New Yorker. 94 (32): 38–46.
- — (September 7, 2020). "The uncounted". Letter from Florida. The New Yorker. 96 (26): 34–45. (Note: Online version is titled "Who gets to vote in Florida?".)
- — (September 13, 2021). "War with a human face : have rules to curb the cuelty of military force backfired?". The Critics. Books. The New Yorker. 97 (28): 68–72. (Note: Online version is titled "Did making the rules of war better make the world worse?".)

———————
