= Nogeun-ri =

Village in North Chungcheong, South Korea

Coordinates: 36°13′6″N 127°52′49″E

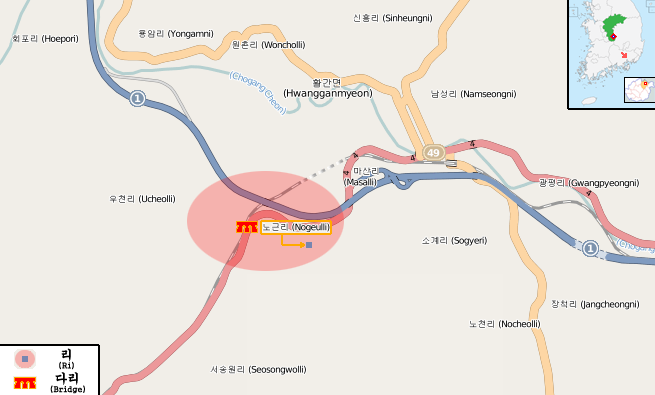
- Map of Nogeun-ri

Korean name
- Hangul: 노근리
- Hanja: 老斤里
- RR: Nogeun-ri
- MR: Nogŭn-ri

Nogeun-ri (Korean: 노근리), also No Gun Ri, is a village in Hwanggan-myeon, Yeongdong County, North Chungcheong Province in central South Korea.

The village was the closest named place to the site of the No Gun Ri Massacre (July 26–29, 1950) during the Korean War, in which the U.S. military killed South Korean civilians fleeing their nearby villages. A South Korean government committee in 2005 certified the names of 163 dead and missing and 55 wounded, and said many other victims' names were never reported. The South Korean government-funded No Gun Ri Peace Foundation, which operates a memorial park at the massacre site, estimated in 2011 that 250–300 were killed, mostly women and children.

Korean records show Nogeun-ri as a very old village, its earliest mention coming in 11th-century sources. Gazetteers say the village was laid waste during the 16th-century invasions of Japanese shogun Hideyoshi. At the time of the Korean War massacre, it was in a typical Korean rice-growing area, but many fields were converted to vineyards in later years.

An act of the National Assembly in 2004 called for building the memorial park at the massacre site, which had begun attracting 20,000 to 30,000 visitors a year. The 33-acre (13-ha.) No Gun Ri Memorial Peace Park, built with $17 million in government funds and featuring a memorial, museum and peace education center, opened in October 2011. In 2009, Yeongdong County established a nearby cemetery to which some victims' remains were moved from family plots. The 8th International Conference for Museums of Peace was held at the park in September 2014.

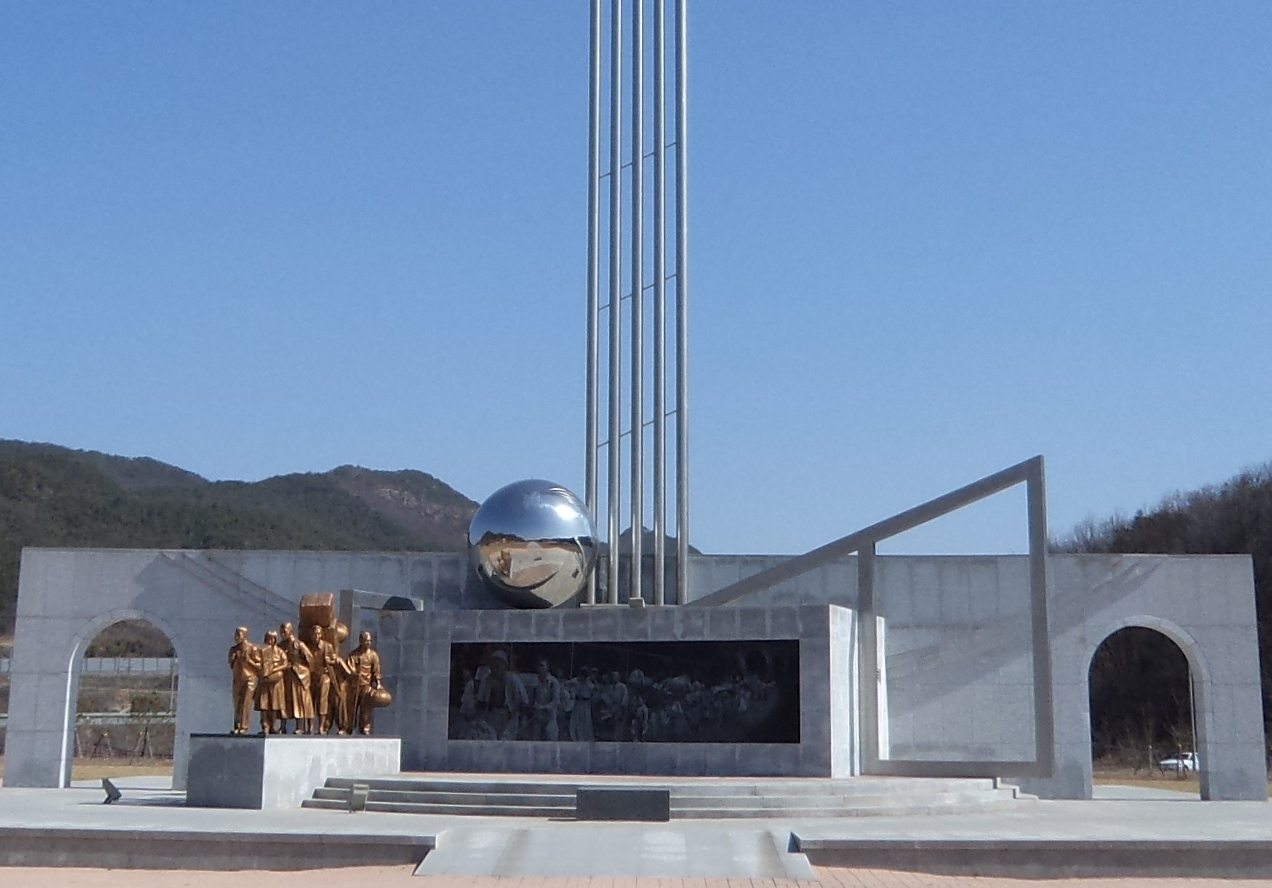
No Gun Ri Memorial Peace Park Memorial Tower

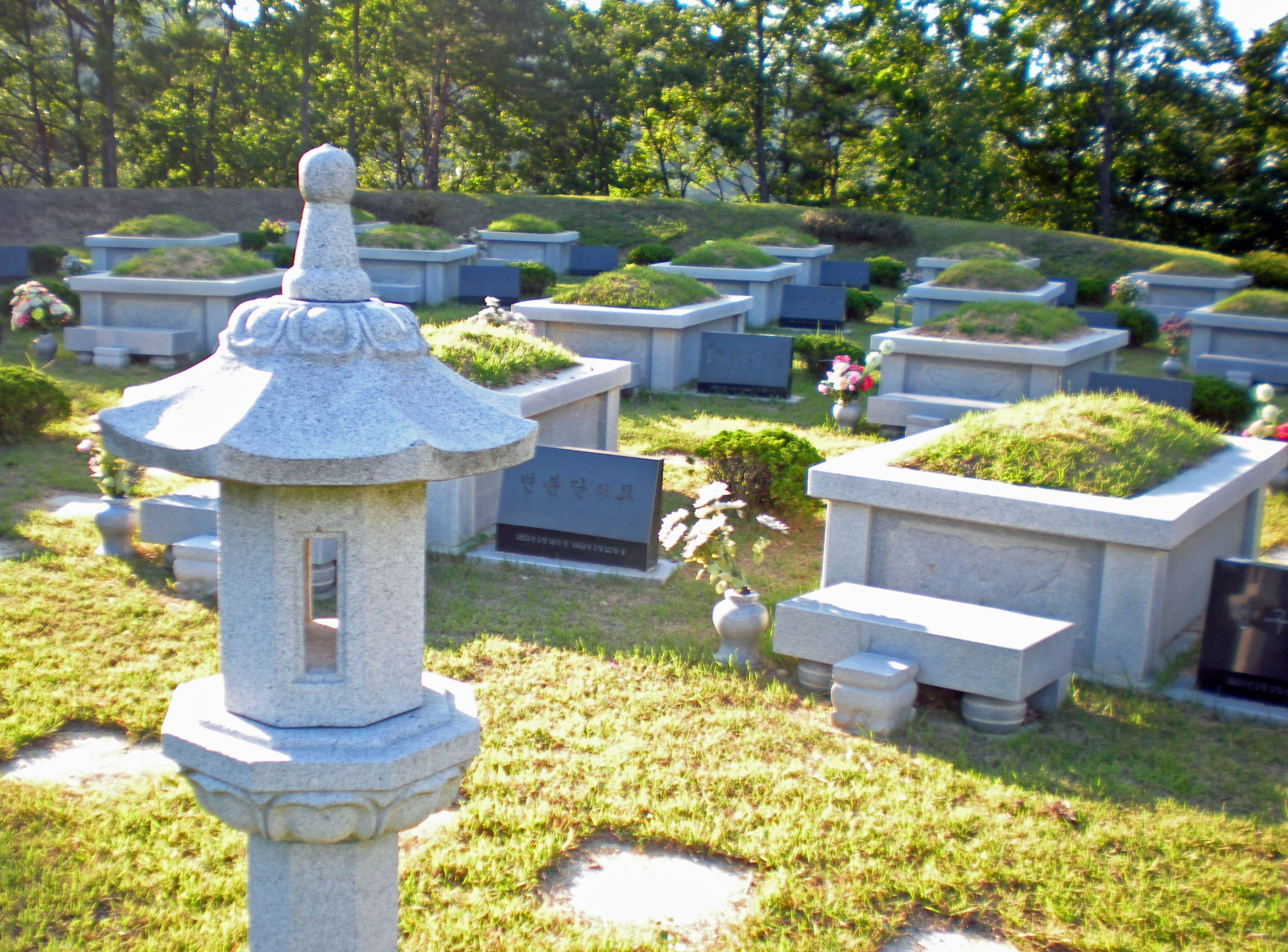
The cemetery on a hilltop overlooking the No Gun Ri Memorial Peace Park holds remains of some of the massacre's victims.
